= List of songs recorded by Ashley Tisdale =

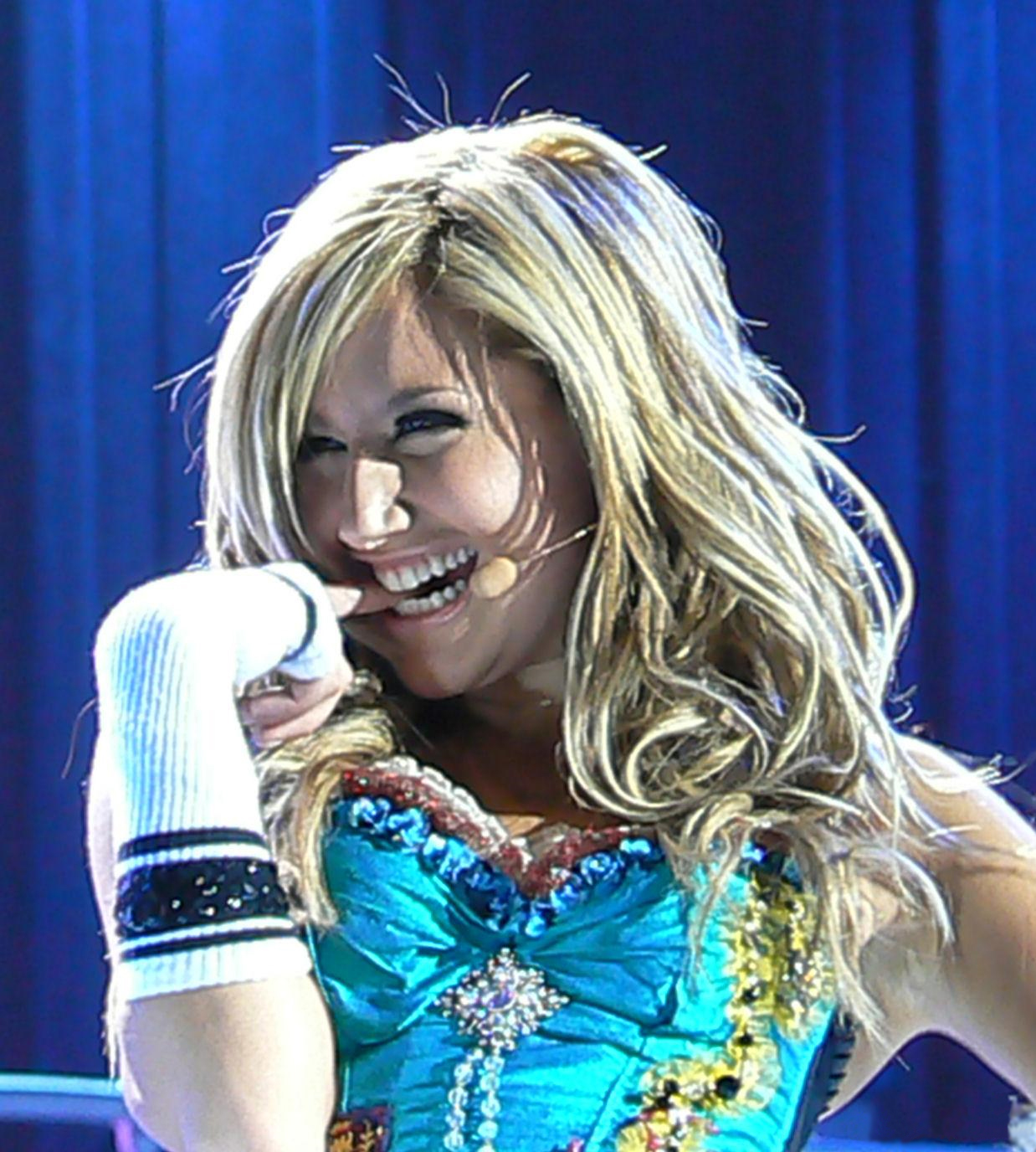
Tisdale during the High School Musical: The Concert in 2007.

American actress, singer and songwriter Ashley Tisdale has recorded material for two studio albums, eleven soundtrack albums and promotional campaigns. In 2006, Tisdale was cast as the popular, narcissistic high school student Sharpay Evans in the film High School Musical. The soundtrack, in which Tisdale lent her vocals for several songs, became the top-selling album in the United States that year. Tisdale became the first female artist to debut with two songs simultaneously on the Billboard Hot 100 chart with "What I've Been Looking For" and "Bop to the Top", both tracks from the film's soundtrack.

Due to the popularity earned by Tisdale through her performance in High School Musical, Warner Bros. Records signed her for a recording contract in July 2006. Tisdale then began to work on her debut studio album Headstrong, which was released in February 2007. For the album, she co-wrote the track "Over It", the bonus track "It's Life" and the singles "Not Like That" and "Suddenly". The success of the first High School Musical film led Tisdale to reprise the role in the film's two sequels and spin-off, recording several tracks for the soundtracks. In 2008, Tisdale recorded covers of popular songs from the 1980s and 1990s to promote a deodorant by Degree. The following year, Tisdale released her second studio album Guilty Pleasure. The tracks "It's Alright, It's OK" and "Crank It Up" were released as singles. She also worked as a co-writer on the album, having writing credits in the promotional singles "Acting Out", "Overrated" and "What If", and the tracks "Me Without You" and "Whatcha Waiting For".

== Songs ==
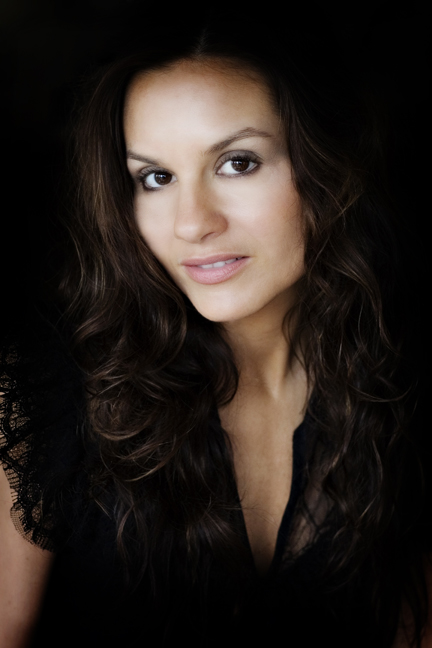
Songwriter Kara DioGuardi (pictured) worked with Tisdale in songs for her two studio albums, including the single "Be Good to Me"

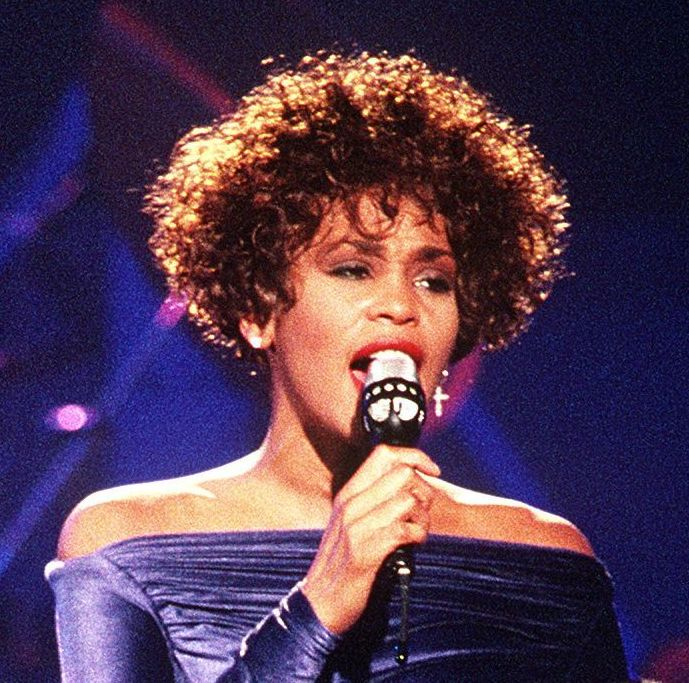
Tisdale covered five hits for a promotional campaign for Degree, including a Whitney Houston (pictured) number one single.

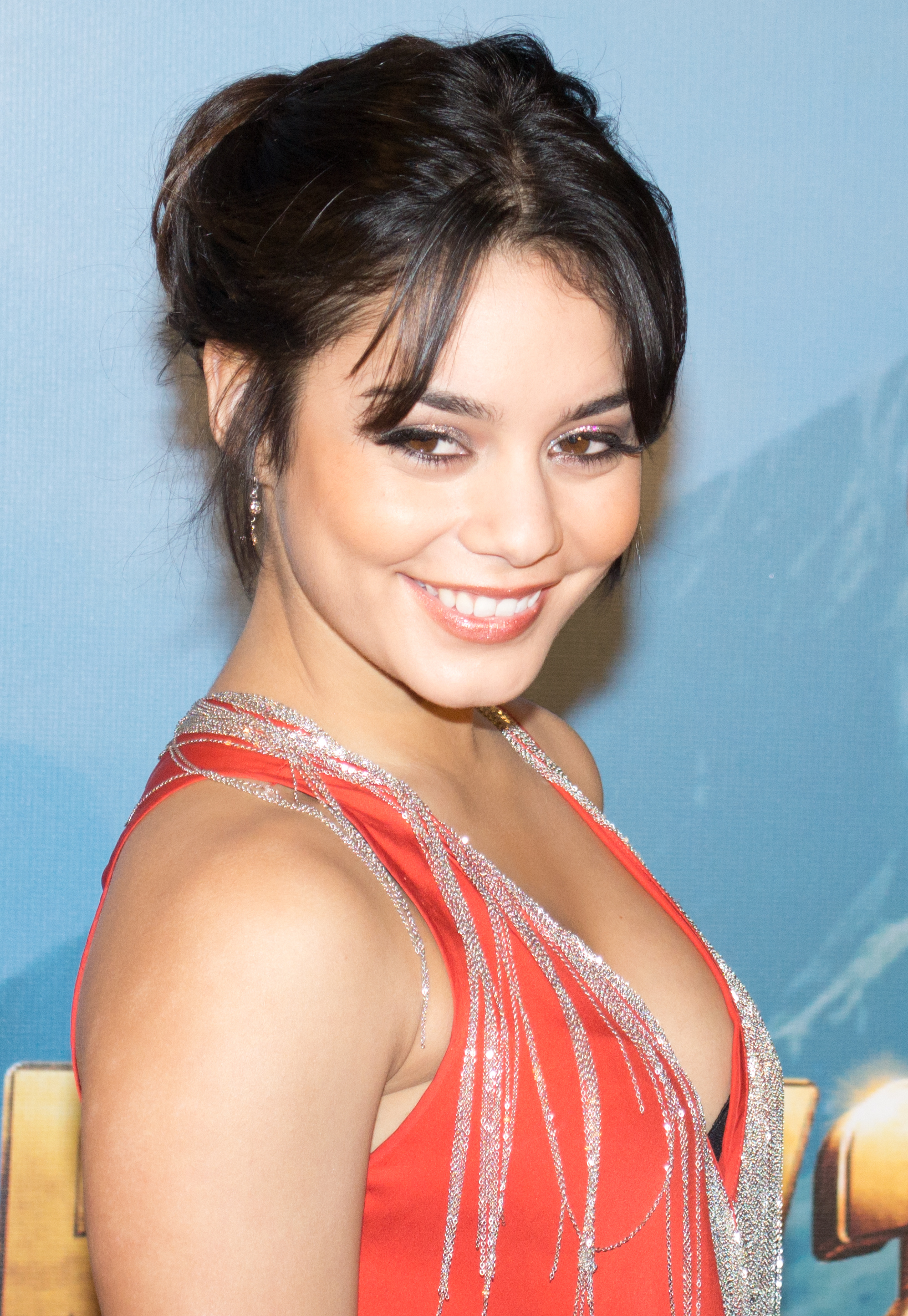
Tisdale released several tracks among the cast of High School Musical, which also includes American actress and singer Vanessa Hudgens (pictured).

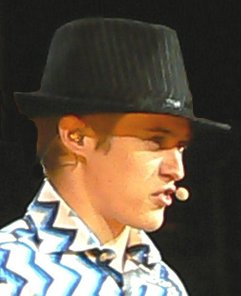
Most of the songs recorded with Lucas Grabeel (pictured) for the High School Musical film series were released as singles.

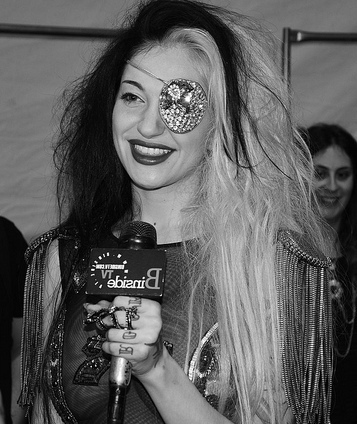
Singer Porcelain Black (pictured) has writing credits in the song "How Do You Love Someone" and also provided background vocals in the track "Masquerade".

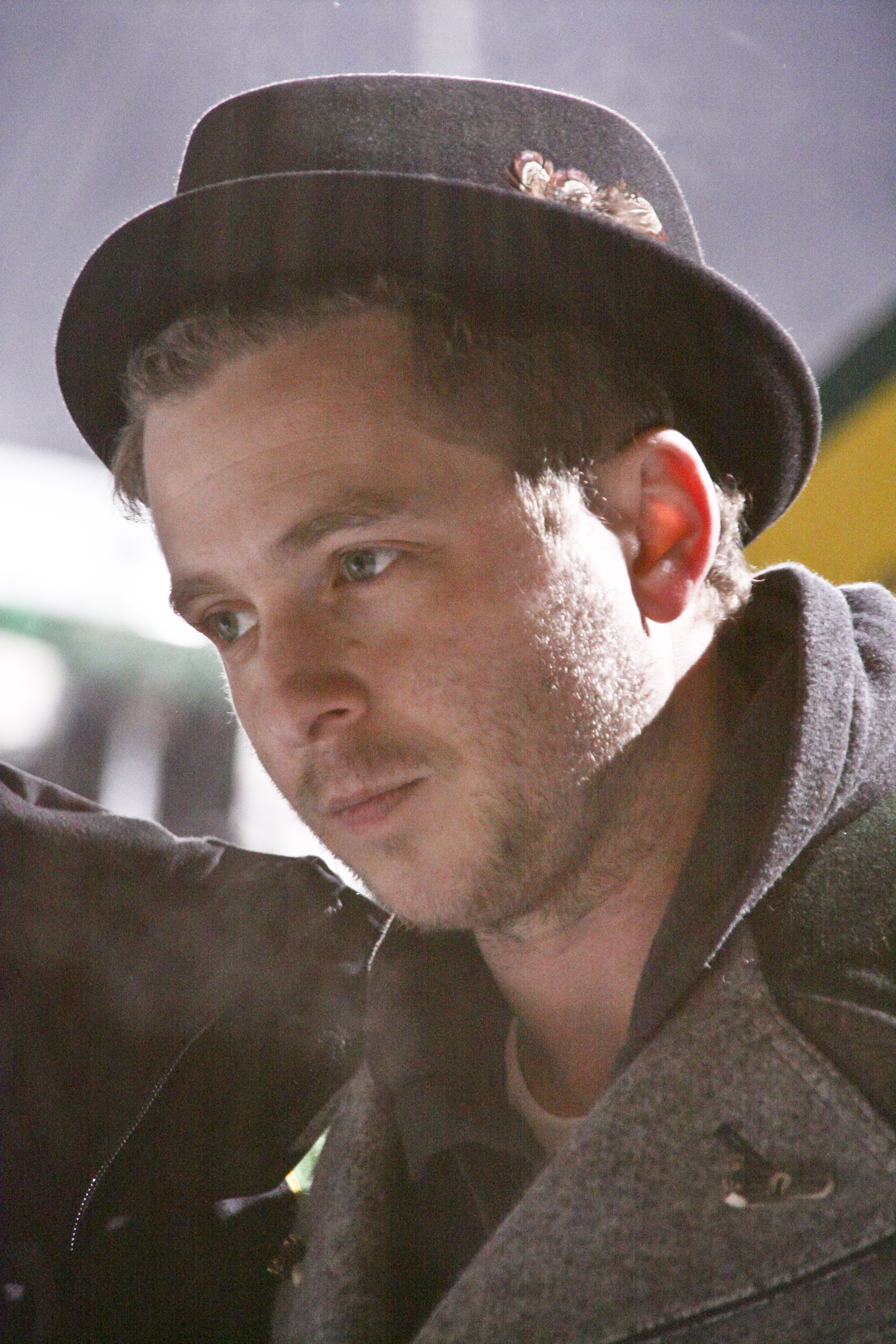
OneRepublic's vocalist Ryan Tedder (pictured) worked with Tisdale on her single "He Said She Said", which became her best charting solo single in the U.S.

Key
†	Indicates single release
#	Indicates promotional single release
‡	Indicates song co-written by Tisdale
•	Indicates promotional releases for Degree

Song	Artist(s)	Writer(s)	Release(s)	Year	Ref.
"Acting Out" #	Ashley Tisdale	Ashley Tisdale‡ Niclas Molinder; Joacim Persson; Steve McMorran; Johan Alkenäs; David Jassy	Guilty Pleasure	2009	
"All for One"	Ashley Tisdale (as part of the cast of High School Musical)	Matthew Gerrard; Robbie Nevil	High School Musical 2	2007	
"Be Good to Me" †	Ashley Tisdale	Kara DioGuardi; Joacim Persson; Niclas Molinder	Headstrong	2006	
"Blame It On the Beat"	Ashley Tisdale	Adam Anders; Nicole Hassman; Peer Åström	Guilty Pleasure	2009	
"Bop to the Top" †	Ashley Tisdale with Lucas Grabeel	David Lawrence; Matthew Gerrard; Robbie Nevil	High School Musical	2006	
"Busted"	Ashley Tisdale and Olivia Olson	Dan Povenmire; Martin Olson; Danny Jacop	Phineas & Ferb	2009	
"Candace Party"	Ashley Tisdale	Dan Povenmire; Jeff "Swampy" Marsh; Jon Colton Barry	Phineas and Ferb: Across the 1st and 2nd Dimensions	2011	
"A Christmas Wish (Reprise)"	Ashley Tisdale, Benjy Norman, Grant Olding and Martin Freeman	—N/a	Saving Santa	2013	
"Crank It Up" †	Ashley Tisdale	Niclas Molinder; Joacim Persson; Johan Alkenäs; David Jassy	Guilty Pleasure	2009	
"Delete You"	Ashley Tisdale	Diane Warren	Guilty Pleasure	2009	
"Do Nothing Day"	Ashley Tisdale with Mitchel Musso	Jon Colton Barry	Phineas & Ferb	2009	
"Do or Die"	Ashley Tisdale and Martin Freeman	—N/a	Saving Santa	2013	
"Don't Touch (The Zoom Song)"	Ashley Tisdale	Adam Anders; Nikki Hassman; Rasmus Bille	Headstrong	2007	
"A Dream is a Wish Your Heart Makes"	Ashley Tisdale (among Disney Channel Circle of Stars)	Mack David; Al Hoffman; Jerry Livingston	DisneyMania 4	2006	
"Erase and Rewind"	Ashley Tisdale	Niclas Molinder; Joacim Persson; Johan Fransson; Tim Larsson; Tobias Lundgren	Guilty Pleasure	2009	
"Extraordinary"	Ashley Tisdale	Dan Povenmire; Martin Olson; Danny Jacop	Phineas & Ferb: Rockin' and Rollin'	2013	
"Fabulous" †	Ashley Tisdale with Lucas Grabeel	Faye Greenberg; David Lawrence; Matthew Gerrard; Robbie Nevil	High School Musical 2	2007	
"Feeling So Good"	Ashley Tisdale	Ashley Tisdale‡ John Feldmann; Scot Stewart; Rachel West; Dylan McLean	Symptoms	2019	
"Gitchee Gitchee Go"	Ashley Tisdale with Vincent Martella	Dan Povenmire; Jeff "Swampy" Marsh; Jon Colton Barry	Phineas & Ferb	2009	
"Goin' Crazy"	Ashley Tisdale	Joacim Persson; Niclas Molinder; Pette Ankarberg; Celetia Martin	Headstrong	2007	
"Gonna Shine"	Ashley Tisdale	Tim Heintz; Randy Petersen; Kevin Quinn	Sharpay's Fabulous Adventure	2011	
"Guilty Pleasure"	Ashley Tisdale	Joy Lynn Strand; Adam Longlands; Lauren Christy; Scott Spock	Guilty Pleasure	2009	
"Hair"	Ashley Tisdale	Warren Felder; Andrew Wansel; Chasity Nwagbara	Guilty Pleasure	2009	
"Headstrong"	Ashley Tisdale	Adam Longlands; Scott Spock; Lauren Christy; Graham Edwards	Headstrong	2007	
"He Said She Said" †	Ashley Tisdale	J.R. Rotem; Evan "Kidd" Bogart; Ryan Tedder	Headstrong	2006	
"Heaven Is a Place on Earth"	Ashley Tisdale	Rick Nowels; Ellen Shipley	Degree •	2008	
"High School Musical"	Ashley Tisdale (as part of the cast of High School Musical)	Matthew Gerrard; Robbie Nevil	High School Musical 3: Senior Year	2008	
"Hot Mess"	Ashley Tisdale	Warren Felder; Heather Bright	Guilty Pleasure	2009	
"How Do You Love Someone"	Ashley Tisdale	Billy Steinberg; Josh Alexander; Porcelain Black	Guilty Pleasure	2009	
"HUMUHUMUNUKUNUKUAPUA'A"	Ashley Tisdale with Lucas Grabeel	David Lawrence; Faye Greenberg	High School Musical 2	2007	
"I'm Back"	Ashley Tisdale	Lars Halvor Jensen; Dicky Klein; Johannes Joergensen; Frankie Storm	Guilty Pleasure	2009	
"I Can't Take My Eyes Off of You"	Ashley Tisdale with Lucas Grabeel, Vanessa Hudgens and Zac Efron	Jamie Houston; David Lawrence; Robbie Nevil; Randy Petersen; Kevin Quinn	High School Musical	2006	
"I Love You Mom"	Ashley Tisdale	Dan Povenmire; Jeff "Swampy" Marsh; Martin Olson	Phineas & Ferb	2009	
"I Wanna Dance With Somebody (Who Loves Me)"	Ashley Tisdale	Narada Michael Walden; Whitney Houston	Degree •	2008	
"I Want It All" †	Ashley Tisdale with Lucas Grabeel	Matthew Gerrard; Robbie Nevil	High School Musical 3: Senior Year	2008	
"I Will Be Me"	Ashley Tisdale	Bryan Todd; Michael Smith; TJ Stafford	Headstrong	2007	
"Insomnia"	Ashley Tisdale	Ashley Tisdale‡ John Feldmann; Scot Stewart; Fiona Bevan; Dylan McLean	Symptoms	2019	
"Intro"	Ashley Tisdale	—N/a	Headstrong	2007	
"It's Alright, It's OK" †	Ashley Tisdale	Niclas Molinder; Joacim Persson; Johan Alkenas; David Jassy	Guilty Pleasure	2009	
"It's Life"	Ashley Tisdale	Ashley Tisdale‡ Adam Longlands; Lauren Christy; Scott Spock; Graham Edwards	Headstrong	2007	
"Kiss the Girl" †	Ashley Tisdale	Alan Menken; Howard Ashman	Little Mermaid	2006	
"Last Christmas" †	Ashley Tisdale	George Michael	Non-album single	2006	
"Lemons" †	Ashley Tisdale	Ashley Tisdale‡ Scot Stewart; Rachel West	Non-album single	2020	
"Livin' With Monkeys"	Ashley Tisdale	Dan Povenmire; Martin Olson; Danny Jacop	Phineas & Ferb: Rockin' and Rollin'	2013	
"Looking Glass"	Ashley Tisdale	Ashley Tisdale‡ John Feldmann; Scot Stewart; Rachel West; Dylan McLean	Symptoms	2019	
"Love Me & Let Me Go" †	Ashley Tisdale	Ashley Tisdale‡ John Feldmann; Scot Stewart; Fiona Bevan; Whitney Phillips	Symptoms	2019	
"Love Me For Me"	Ashley Tisdale	Diane Warren	Headstrong	2007	
"Masquerade" #	Ashley Tisdale	Leah Haywood; Daniel James; Shelly Peiken	Guilty Pleasure	2009	
"Me Without You"	Ashley Tisdale	Ashley Tisdale‡ Toby Gad; Lindsay Robins	Guilty Pleasure	2009	
"My Boi and Me"	Ashley Tisdale	Amy Powers; Matthew Tishler	Sharpay's Fabulous Adventure	2011	
"Mysterious Force"	Ashley Tisdale	Dan Povenmire; Jeff "Swampy" Marsh; Jon Colton Barry	Phineas and Ferb: Across the 1st and 2nd Dimensions	2011	
"Never Gonna Give You Up"	Ashley Tisdale	Mike Stock; Matt Aitken; Pete Waterman	Degree •	2008	
"New York's Best Kept Secret"	Ashley Tisdale	Faye Greenberg; David Lawrence	Sharpay's Fabulous Adventure	2011	
"A Night to Remember"	Ashley Tisdale (as part of the cast of High School Musical)	Matthew Gerrard; Robbie Nevil	High School Musical 3: Senior Year	2008	
"Not Like That" †	Ashley Tisdale	Ashley Tisdale‡ Niclas Molinder; Joacim Persson; Pete Ankarberg; David Jassy	Headstrong	2007	
"Over It"	Ashley Tisdale	Ashley Tisdale‡ Bryan Todd; Michael Smith	Headstrong	2007	
"Overrated" #	Ashley Tisdale	Ashley Tisdale‡ Niclas Molinder; Joacim Persson; Johan Alkenäs; Charlie Masson	Guilty Pleasure	2009	
"Positivity"	Ashley Tisdale	Guy Roche; Shelly Peiken; Samantha Jade	Headstrong	2007	
"Queen of Mars"	Ashley Tisdale	Dan Povenmire; Martin Olson; Danny Jacop	Phineas & Ferb	2009	
"The Rest of My Life"	Ashley Tisdale	Amy Powers; Matthew Tishler	Sharpay's Fabulous Adventure	2011	
"Senior Year Spring Musical"	Ashley Tisdale (as part of the cast of High School Musical)	Andy Dodd; Matthew Gerrard; Robbie Nevil; Randy Petersen; Kevin Quinn; Adam Watts	High School Musical 3: Senior Year	2008	
"So Much for You"	Ashley Tisdale	Adam Longlands; Lauren Christy; Scott Spock; Graham Edwards	Headstrong	2007	
"Some Day My Prince Will Come"	Ashley Tisdale with Drew Seeley	Larry Morey	DisneyMania 4	2006	
"Some Kind of Miracle"	Ashley Tisdale	—N/a	Saving Santa	2013	
"Stick to the Status Quo"	Ashley Tisdale (as part of the cast of High School Musical)	Jamie Houston; David Lawrence; Robbie Nevil; Randy Petersen; Kevin Quinn	High School Musical	2006	
"Suddenly" †	Ashley Tisdale	Ashley Tisdale‡ Janice Robinson	Headstrong	2007	
"Summer Belongs to You"	Ashley Tisdale with Vincent Mantella and Alyson Stoner	Dan Povenmire; Martin Olson; Danny Jacop	Phineas & Ferb: Summer Belongs to You	2010	
"Switch"	Ashley Tisdale	Kate Akhurst; Vince Pizzinga	Guilty Pleasure	2009	
"Symptoms"	Ashley Tisdale	Ashley Tisdale‡ John Feldmann; Scot Stewart; Rachel West; Dylan McLean	Symptoms	2019	
"Tell Me Lies"	Ashley Tisdale	Jess Cates; Emanuel Kiriakou; Frankie Storm	Guilty Pleasure	2009	
"Time After Time"	Ashley Tisdale	Cyndi Lauper; Rob Hyman	Degree •	2008	
"Time's Up"	Ashley Tisdale	Lauren Christy; Graham Edwards; Scott Spock	Guilty Pleasure	2009	
"Too Many Walls"	Ashley Tisdale	Cathy Dennis; Anne Dudley	Degree •	2008	
"True Romance"	Ashley Tisdale	Ashley Tisdale‡ John Feldmann; Scot Stewart; Rachel West; Dylan McLean	Symptoms	2019	
"Under Pressure"	Ashley Tisdale	Ashley Tisdale‡ John Feldmann; Scot Stewart; Rachel West; Dylan McLean	Symptoms	2019	
"Unlove You"	Ashley Tisdale	Guy Roche; Shelly Peiken; Sarah Hudson	Headstrong	2007	
"Vibrations"	Ashley Tisdale	Ashley Tisdale‡ John Feldmann; Scot Stewart; Rachel West; Dylan McLean	Symptoms	2019	
"Voices in My Head" †	Ashley Tisdale	Ashley Tisdale‡ John Feldmann; Whitney Lauren Phillips	Symptoms	2018	
"Whatcha Waiting For"	Ashley Tisdale	Ashley Tisdale‡ Niclas Molinder; Joacim Persson; Steve McMorran; Johan Alkenäs; David Jassy	Guilty Pleasure	2009	
"We'll Be Together"	Ashley Tisdale	Shelly Peiken	Headstrong	2007	
"We're All in this Together"	Ashley Tisdale (as part of the cast of High School Musical)	Faye Greenberg; David Lawrence; Matthew Gerrard; Robbie Nevil	High School Musical	2006	
"What Does He Want?"	Ashley Tisdale	Dan Povenmire; Martin Olson; Danny Jacop	Phineas & Ferb: Holiday Favorites	2010	
"What If" #	Ashley Tisdale	Ashley Tisdale‡ Kara DioGuardi; Niclas Molinder; Joacim Persson; Johan Alkenäs	Guilty Pleasure	2009	
"What I've Been Looking For" †	Ashley Tisdale with Lucas Grabeel	David Lawrence; Matthew Gerrard; Robbie Nevil	High School Musical	2006	
"What Time Is It?" †	Ashley Tisdale (as part of the cast of High School Musical)	Matthew Gerrard; Robbie Nevil	High School Musical 2	2007	
"Who I Am"	Ashley Tisdale	Joacim Persson; Niclas Molinder; Pette Ankarberg; Celetia Martin	Headstrong	2007	
"You Are the Music in Me (Sharpay Version)"	Ashley Tisdale with Zac Efron	Jamie Houston	High School Musical 2	2007	
"You're Always Here" †	Ashley Tisdale	Ashley Tisdale‡ Christopher French	Non-album single	2013	
"You're Goin' Down"	Ashley Tisdale with Alyson Stoner and Kelly Hu	Dan Povenmire; Jeff "Swampy" Marsh; Jon Colton Barry	Phineas and Ferb: Across the 1st and 2nd Dimensions	2011	

== See also ==
- Ashley Tisdale discography
