= Ashley Tisdale discography =

Cataloguing of published recordings by Ashley Tisdale

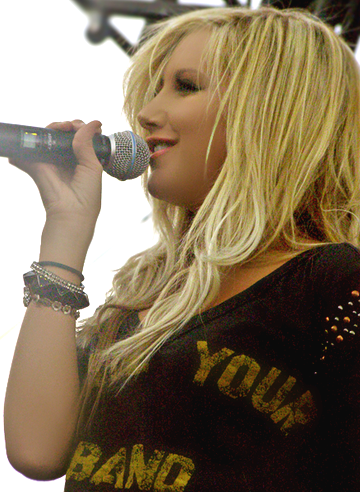
- Tisdale performing at the opening for the first Microsoft Store in Scottsdale, Arizona on October 22, 2009.
- Studio albums: 3
- Extended plays: 2
- Soundtrack albums: 6
- Singles: 9
- Music videos: 11
- Promotional singles: 7

American singer and actress Ashley Tisdale has released three studio albums, one soundtrack album, one extended play, and ten singles. Prior to launching a musical career of her own, Tisdale starred as Sharpay Evans on the Disney Channel Original Movie High School Musical in 2006. Consequently, it became a franchise that released several soundtracks, in which she performed under character. The 2006 soundtrack became the top-selling album in the United States that year. With "What I've Been Looking For" and "Bop to the Top", both singles from that soundtrack, she became the first female artist to debut with two songs simultaneously on the US Billboard Hot 100.

The success of the High School Musical series led Warner Bros. Records to offer her a record deal. After signing with the label, she immediately started work on her debut album. Entitled Headstrong, her first album was released in February 2007, debuted at number five on Billboard 200, and was later certified Gold by the Recording Industry Association of America (RIAA) for shipments of over 500,000 units. To promote the album, four singles were released, including "He Said She Said", which is Tisdale's most successful single in the United States.

Tisdale began work on her second studio album soon after she finished promoting High School Musical 3: Senior Year in 2008. Guilty Pleasure was released in 2009 and debuted at number twelve on Billboard 200, selling 25,000 copies in the first week; this was significantly lower than the first-week sales for her previous album. The lead single "It's Alright, It's OK" had moderate commercial performance in some European countries.

In 2013, Tisdale announced she has been recording for her third studio album. In December 2013, she announced she would be releasing a charity single titled "You're Always Here" written about her late grandfather. The song was eventually released independently to digital stores that same month.

== Albums ==
=== Studio albums ===
List of albums, with selected chart positions and certifications
Title	Album details	Peak chart positions										Certifications
Title	Album details	US	AUS	AUT	CAN	GER	IRL	NZ	SPA	SWI	UK	Certifications
Headstrong	Released: February 6, 2007; Label: Warner Bros.; Formats: CD, LP, digital download, streaming	5	80	21	—	33	16	22	2	98	155	RIAA: Gold; CAPIF: Gold; IRMA: Gold
Guilty Pleasure	Released: July 28, 2009; Label: Warner Bros.; Formats: CD, LP, digital download, streaming	12	—	7	15	9	30	27	9	13	130	
Symptoms	Released: May 3, 2019; Label: Big Noise; Formats: Digital download, streaming	—	—	—	—	—	—	—	—	—	— (Note: "Symptoms" did not enter the UK Top 100 Albums Chart, but peaked at number 52 on the UK Download Albums chart.)	
"—" denotes a recording that did not chart or was not released in that territory.

=== Soundtrack albums ===
List of soundtrack albums, with selected chart positions and certifications
Title	Album details	Peak chart positions										Certifications
Title	Album details	US	AUS	AUT	CAN	FRA	GER	ITA	NZ	SWI	UK Comp.	Certifications
High School Musical	Released: January 10, 2006; Formats: CD, digital download; Label: Walt Disney	1	1	13	—	6	22	2	1	63	1	RIAA: 4× Platinum; ARIA: Platinum; BPI: 4× Platinum; BVMI: Platinum; IFPI AUT: Platinum; MC: Platinum; SNEP: Gold
High School Musical 2	Released: August 14, 2007; Formats: CD, digital download; Label: Walt Disney	1	4	2	1	12	5	1	3	6	1	RIAA: 3× Platinum; ARIA: Platinum; BPI: 2× Platinum; BVMI: Platinum; IFPI AUT: Platinum; MC: 2× Platinum; IFPI SWI: Gold; SNEP: Gold
High School Musical 3	Released: October 21, 2008; Formats: CD, digital download; Label: Walt Disney	2	4	1	2	6	3	1	1	6	1	RIAA: Platinum; ARIA: Platinum; BPI: Platinum; BVMI: Platinum; IFPI AUT: Platinum; MC: 2× Platinum; IFPI SWI: Gold; RMNZ: 2× Platinum; SNEP: Platinum
Phineas and Ferb	Released: September 22, 2009; Format: CD, digital download; Label: Walt Disney	59	—	—	—	—	—	—	—	—	—	
Sharpay's Fabulous Adventure	Released: April 19, 2011; Format: CD, digital download; Label: Walt Disney	—	—	—	—	—	—	—	—	—	—	
"—" denotes a recording that did not chart or was not released in that territory.

=== Video albums ===
List of video albums, with selected details
Title	Album details
There's Something About Ashley	Released: November 6, 2007; Label: Warner Bros.; Format: DVD

== Extended plays ==
List of EPs, with selected details
Title	Details
Degree Girl: OMG! Jams	Released: June 1, 2008; Label: Warner Bros.; Format: Digital download
Music Sessions, Vol.1	Released: February 16, 2018; Label: Self-released; Format: Streaming, digital download

== Singles ==
=== As lead artist ===
List of singles as lead artist, with selected chart positions and certifications, showing year released and album name
Title	Year	Peak chart positions										Certifications	Album
Title	Year	US	AUT	CAN	CZE	EU	FIN	GER	SWE	SWI	UK	Certifications	Album
"Be Good to Me"	2006	80	67	—	—	—	—	57	—	—	—	RIAA: Gold	Headstrong
"He Said She Said"	2007	58	21	— (Note: "He Said She Said" did not enter the Billboard Canadian Hot 100, but peaked at number 69 on the Canadian Digital Song Sales chart.)	—	65	—	17	—	—	155	RIAA: Platinum	Headstrong
"Not Like That"	2008	—	31	—	52	68	—	20	—	27	—		Headstrong
"Suddenly"	2008	—	—	—	—	—	—	45	—	—	—		Headstrong
"I Want It All" (with Lucas Grabeel)	2008	— (Note: "I Want It All" did not enter the Billboard Hot 100 but peaked at number 13 on the Bubbling Under Hot 100 Singles chart.)	—	— (Note: "I Want It All" did not enter the Billboard Canadian Hot 100, but peaked at number 75 on the Canadian Digital Song Sales chart.)	—	—	—	—	—	—	87		High School Musical 3
"It's Alright, It's OK"	2009	99	5	74	37	38	20	12	38	30	104		Guilty Pleasure
"Crank It Up"	2009	—	22	—	—	66	—	19	—	—	—		Guilty Pleasure
"Voices in My Head"	2018	—	—	—	—	—	—	—	—	—	—		Symptoms
"Love Me & Let Me Go"	2019	—	—	—	—	—	—	—	—	—	—		Symptoms
"—" denotes a recording that did not chart or was not released in that territory.

=== As featured artist ===
List of singles as featured artist, with selected chart positions and certifications
Title	Year	Peak chart positions						Certifications	Album
Title	Year	US	AUS	CAN	IRE	NZ	UK	Certifications	Album
"We're All In This Together" (among High School Musical cast)	2006	34	86	—	31	14	40	RIAA: Gold; BPI: Silver	High School Musical
"What Time Is It?" (among High School Musical cast)	2007	6	20	66	10	—	20	RIAA: Gold	High School Musical 2
"A Night to Remember" (among High School Musical cast)	2008	— (Note: "A Night to Remember" did not enter the Billboard Hot 100 but peaked at number eight on the Bubbling Under Hot 100 Singles chart.)	96	—	—	—	94		High School Musical 3
"—" denotes releases that did not chart or were not released in that territory.

=== Promotional singles ===
List of promotional singles, with selected chart positions, showing year released and album name
Title	Year	Peak chart positions		Album
Title	Year	US	UK	Album
"Kiss the Girl"	2006	81	86	The Little Mermaid
"Last Christmas"	2006	—	—	Disney Channel Holiday
"Masquerade"	2009	—	—	Guilty Pleasure
"Overrated"	2009	— (Note: "Overrated" did not enter the Billboard Hot 100 but peaked at number three on the Bubbling Under Hot 100 Singles chart.)	—	Guilty Pleasure
"What If"	2009	— (Note: "What If" did not enter the Billboard Hot 100 but peaked at number one on the Bubbling Under Hot 100 Singles chart.)	—	Guilty Pleasure
"Acting Out"	2009	—	—	Guilty Pleasure
"You're Always Here"	2013	—	—	Non-album promotional singles
"Still Into You" (featuring Chris French)	2016	—	—	Non-album promotional singles
"Lemons"	2020	—	—	Non-album promotional singles
"—" denotes a recording that did not chart or was not released in that territory.

== Other charted songs ==
List of songs, with selected chart positions and certifications, showing year released and album name
Title	Year	Peak chart positions				Certifications	Album
Title	Year	US	AUS	CAN Dig.	UK	Certifications	Album
"What I've Been Looking For" (with Lucas Grabeel)	2006	35	—	—	155	RIAA: Gold	High School Musical
"Stick to the Status Quo" (among High School Musical cast)	2006	43	—	—	74	RIAA: Gold	High School Musical
"Bop to the Top" (with Lucas Grabeel)	2006	62	—	—	137		High School Musical
"Headstrong"	2007	— (Note: "Headstrong" did not enter the Billboard Hot 100 but peaked at number 21 on the Bubbling Under Hot 100 Singles chart.)	—	—	—		Headstrong
"Fabulous" (with Lucas Grabeel)	2007	76	64	63	64	RIAA: Gold	High School Musical 2
"You Are the Music in Me (Reprise)" (with Zac Efron)	2007	—	—	—	89		High School Musical 2
"All for One" (among High School Musical cast)	2007	92	—	62	87		High School Musical 2
"High School Musical" (among High School Musical cast)	2008	—	—	—	105		High School Musical 3
"—" denotes a recording that did not chart or was not released in that territory.

== Music videos ==
Title	Year	Director
"A Dream is a Wish Your Heart Makes"	2006	Unknown
"Kiss the Girl"	2006	Unknown
"Be Good to Me"	2007	Chris Marrs Piliero
"He Said She Said"	2007	Scott Speer
"Not Like That"	2007	Scott Speer
"Suddenly"	2007	Scott Speer
It's Alright, It's OK"	2009	Scott Speer
"Love Drunk"	2009	Travis Kopach
"Crank It Up"	2009	Scott Speer
"Voices in My Head"	2018	Brian Petchers
"Love Me & Let Me Go"	2019	Stephen Herek
