= You're Always Here =

Promotional single by Ashley Tisdale
- Released: December 16, 2013
- Recorded: 2013
- Genre: Pop
- Length: 3:45
- Label: Self-release
- Songwriters: Ashley Tisdale; Christopher French
- Producer: French

"You're Always Here" is a song by Ashley Tisdale. It was written by Tisdale herself and her then-fiancé Christopher French, who also produced the track. The song was released to digital retailers worldwide on December 16, 2013. "You're Always Here" is the first song Tisdale released since her second studio album Guilty Pleasure (2009) and marks her return to music. Written about Tisdale's late grandfather, the song is a mid-tempo ballad, highlighted by piano, organ and a blippy beat, about finding strength in loss.

== Background ==
Tisdale released her second studio album Guilty Pleasure (2009) via Warner Bros. Records. Described by Tisdale as a "rocker and edgier" album, it generated mixed reviews, with a 54% rating on Metacritic. It debuted at number 12 on the Billboard 200, selling 25,000 copies in the first week; this was significantly lower than the first-week sales for her previous album Headstrong (2007). Promotion for the album ended in the end of that year, following the release of the album's second single "Crank It Up", and, in order to start focusing on her career as an actress and producer, Tisdale decided to end her record deal with Warner Bros. Records.

While promoting the film Scary Movie 5 (2013), in which she starred, Tisdale said in an interview to MTV that she was inspired to create music again and confirmed that since 2012 she has been recording for her third studio album. She hopes to "surprise people a little bit, [with] something different from what [she has] done before". Tisdale became engaged to musician Christopher French in August, 2013 and they began working together on music for her third studio album.

== Release ==
On November 19, 2013, Tisdale teased about an upcoming "special project" that would come out before Christmas on her Twitter account. She later added the project would be released on December 16, 2013. Ten days before the release of the project, Tisdale posted a picture of herself in a recording studio; thus confirmed the project was indeed related to music. On December 9, Tisdale announced the project would be a brand new song titled "You're Always Here", her first release on music since 2009. The artwork for the single was posted on her Twitter account that same day. The single, an independent recording, was eventually released on December 16, 2013, on digital retailers worldwide.

Tisdale premiered the song on On Air with Ryan Seacrest and confirmed thirty percent of the proceeds also go to St. Jude Children’s Research Hospital.

== Composition ==
"It's actually about my grandfather who passed away in September. It was something that just kind of came organically. I would go on walks and just write down some lyrics—and didn't even think I was gonna make it into a song—but my fiancé [Christopher French] who produces music, actually sat down with me and we put it together

— Tisdale discusses the creation of the song"

"You're Always Here" is a midtempo pop ballad. The instrumentation of the song includes elements of piano, organ and a blippy beat. The lyric content is basically about finding strength in loss. Tisdale's grandfather Arnold Morris died on September 2, 2013, and the loss inspired her to write the song.

After writing down some lyrics, Tisdale sat together with her fiancé Christopher French and started discussing the creation of the song. In an interview to E! News, she stated French "knew exactly what [she] wanted to do, and [she thinks] for him it was really just trying to help [her] get through what [she] was experiencing." Tisdale was initially reluctant on releasing the song because of how personal it was. She eventually decided to put it out because of her fans.

== Reception ==
Brandon Flores of Blast Out Your Studio gave the song 3 out of 5 stars, saying "Ashley Tisdale's return to music is certainly bitter sweet with the flattering re-imagining of Imagine Dragon's "Demons," yet shines with Tisdale's A+ vocals and lyrics".

== Track listing ==
Digital download
| No. | Title | Length |
|---|---|---|
| 1. | "You're Always Here" | 3:45 |

== Release details ==
| Country | Date | Format | Label |
|---|---|---|---|
| Australia | December 16, 2013 | Digital download | Self-release |
| Austria | December 16, 2013 | Digital download | Self-release |
| Brazil | December 16, 2013 | Digital download | Self-release |
| Canada | December 16, 2013 | Digital download | Self-release |
| France | December 16, 2013 | Digital download | Self-release |
| Germany | December 16, 2013 | Digital download | Self-release |
| Italy | December 16, 2013 | Digital download | Self-release |
| Japan | December 16, 2013 | Digital download | Self-release |
| Mexico | December 16, 2013 | Digital download | Self-release |
| New Zealand | December 16, 2013 | Digital download | Self-release |
| Spain | December 16, 2013 | Digital download | Self-release |
| Sweden | December 16, 2013 | Digital download | Self-release |
| Switzerland | December 16, 2013 | Digital download | Self-release |
| United Kingdom | December 16, 2013 | Digital download | Self-release |
| United States | December 16, 2013 | Digital download | Self-release |
