= Navigators (Swedish band) =

Swedish hip hop group

- Origin: Sweden
- Years active: 1998–99
- Past members: David Jassy; Andrés Avellán

Navigators was a late 1990s Swedish R&B and hip hop duo based in Stockholm and made up of David Jassy and Andrés Avellán (not to be confused with the Celtic Rock band from Newfoundland, Canada, with the same name). They released an album that made the Top 30 in Swedish Albums Chart and three successful singles during 1998–1999.

They released first single, cover of Joyce Sims' song "Come into My Life" in 1998. In the same year they released another single called "I Remember".

In 1999 they released their third and most successful single "Superstar" which reached number 20 in Swedish Singles Chart and stayed there for 11 weeks. In the single "Superstar", Jassy and Avellán sampled bassline from Chic's classic "I Want Your Love".

Based on the success of "Superstar" they released their only album as Navigators entitled Daily Life Illustrators. The album made it to number 27 in the Swedish Albums Chart.

== After the split ==
After the band broke up, band member David Jassy continued with a career as a musician, songwriter and music producer producing for a number of international acts including Ashley Tisdale, Charice Pempengco, No Angels, V Factory, Darin, Heidi Montag.

== Chart positions ==
Year	Album	Peak position SE
1999	Daily Life Illustrators	27

Year	Single	Peak position SE	Album
1998	"Come into My Life"	31	
1998	"I Remember"	46	
1999	"Superstar"	20	

== Discography ==
=== Album ===
- 1999: Daily Life Illustrators (reached No. 27 on Swedish Albums Chart)

Album tracks:

1. "Come Into My Life"
2. "Superstar"
3. "I Remember"
4. "Get a Life"
5. "Something's Wrong"
6. "Dreams"
7. "All Over"
8. "Believe In Yourself"
9. "Blue Hill"
10. "Set Sail"
11. "Snakes"
12. "If You Where Here Tonight"

=== Singles ===
- 1998: "Come Into My Life" (reached No. 31 on Swedish Singles Chart)
- 1998: "I Remember" (reached No. 46 on Swedish Singles Chart)
- 1999: "Superstar" (reached No. 20 on Swedish Singles Chart)
