= David Jassy =

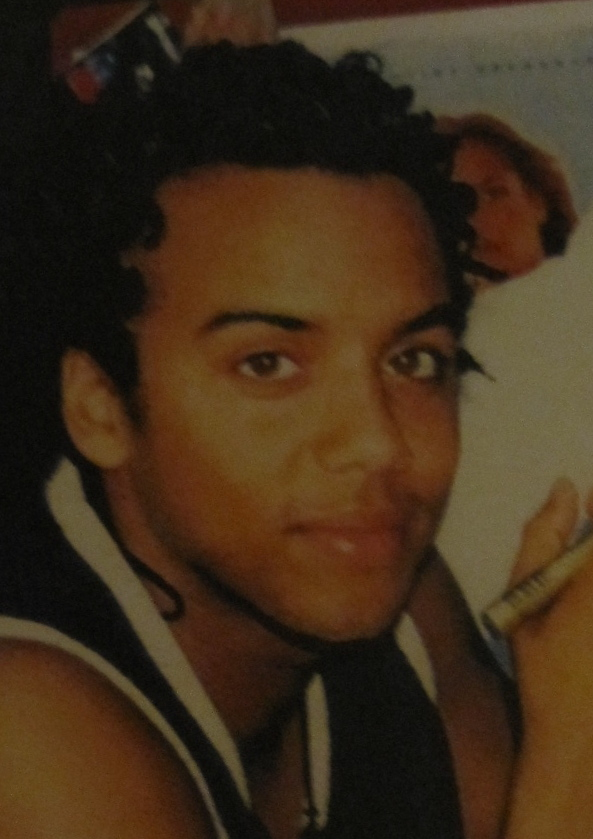
- David Jassy, in 2009.

Background information
- Born: David Moses Jassy; Solna, Sweden
- Genres: Hip hop; R&B
- Occupations: Songwriter; musician; producer; rapper
- Instruments: Vocals; piano; guitar; percussion
- Website: davidjassy.com

David Moses Jassy (born April 11,), is a Swedish musician, songwriter and music producer. With Andrés Avellán, he was part of a Swedish R&B hip hop duo, Navigators. After the group split up, Jassy continued to write music and produce albums for a number of international acts. He is the founder of Jassy World Entertainment, a music production and publishing company.

== Early years: Navigators ==
David Jassy formed the R&B hip hop duo, Navigators with Andrés Avellán. Their first single, a cover of Joyce Sims' song "Come into My Life" was released in 1998. In the same year they released another single called "I Remember".

In 1999 they released their third and most successful single, "Superstar" which stayed on the Swedish Singles Chart for 11 weeks and reached number 20. For the single "Superstar", Jassy and Avellan sampled the bassline from Chic's classic "I Want Your Love". In the same year their only album Daily Life Illustrators was released, reaching number 27 on the Swedish Albums Chart.

== Musical production ==
Jassy co-wrote "Be Good to Me" and "Not Like That" from Ashley Tisdale's Headstrong and "It's Alright, It's OK" and "Crank It Up" from Tisdale's Guilty Pleasure. He also co-wrote "Goodbye to Yesterday" and "Back Off" by No Angels, "Love Struck" by VFactory", "Runaway" and "Karma" for Darin, "Body Language" for Heidi Montag and "Pyramid" for Charice.

He has produced albums for acts such as Akon, Keith Sweat, Ayra Starr, Wale, odumodublvck, Oxlade, Alkaline, French Montana, YG Marley, Chloe Bailey, Ashley Tisdale, Britney Spears, Mariana Froes, Sean Kingston, Davido, Afro B, Snoh Aalegra, Arash, Eve, No Angels, Mohombi, Djodje, David Carreira, Darin, Navigators, Charice, Heidi Montag, Bayanni, singah, AV, Jizzle, Loreen, Petter, 1.cuz, Ant Wan and others.

== Personal life ==
He was born in 1974 in Solna, Sweden to a Gambian father and an Estonian mother. He has one son born in 1997 in Sweden.

=== Murder conviction ===
Incident and arrest

Jassy was arrested by Los Angeles police on November 23, 2008 after a confrontation with jazz musician John Osnes. Osnes was crossing the street at Selma Avenue and Schrader Boulevard. Witnesses told police that Osnes had banged on the front of Jassy's vehicle with his hands in response to Jassy's car moving into the crosswalk. Jassy got out, punched Osnes, and kicked him in the head. The coroner testified that it was either this kick or the resulting fall that broke Osnes's skull and caused his death. Jassy fled, and while leaving the scene his vehicle ran over Osnes. Bystanders and an off-duty Anaheim police officer tried unsuccessfully to detain Jassy. Two other off-duty police officers from Melbourne, Australia were also at the scene. They tried unsuccessfully to revive Osnes. Osnes was pronounced dead on arrival at the hospital, and Jassy was arrested the next day, and charged with one count of murder, along with an additional count of assault with a deadly weapon. He remained in custody on $1 million bail, facing a possible life-with-parole prison term.

Trial and sentencing

The trial began on January 13, 2010. Jassy's attorney contended he was defending himself, his girlfriend, and his vehicle from "an angry drunk." The prosecution countered that Jassy was the aggressor. On February 1, 2010, he was convicted of second-degree murder but not guilty of assault with a deadly weapon and leaving the scene of an accident. On March 4, 2010 Jassy was sentenced to 15 years to life imprisonment. He was scheduled to be eligible for parole in 2024. On March 27, 2020, California governor Gavin Newsom commuted Jassy's sentence to time served, and he was released from prison on parole.

== Recordings under incarceration ==
The Youthful Offender Program (YOP) came about due to a change in U.S. legislation, allowing youthful offenders entering prison under the age of 22 into a level 4 high security prison to be afforded an opportunity to be transferred to San Quentin prison, a level 2 minimum security prison. YOP, run by the California Department of Corrections and Rehabilitation (CDCR), also stipulated the creation of various programs to help in rehabilitation of offenders, with very positive results.

This prompted David Jassy, already in San Quentin, to volunteer in a musical program launched in 2015. Jassy's project YOP Mixtape Project endeavored to help young inmates through his own songwriting and record producing experience to allow them to record their own music in a studio inaugurated in the prison. Jassy explained that he grew up listening to rap and it affected his mood according to what rapper he was listening to. He encouraged the imprisoned youth to channel their feelings through music and lyrics they composed, thus serving as rehabilitation and a tool to help prevent other youth from falling into the same path through listening to music from those actually incarcerated rather than unincarcerated gangsta rappers who glorify prison life. Jassy also imposed a no-profanity rule in the recordings he helped with. From an initial mixtape project, the program developed into a more involved music mentorship program. Jassy said the mixtape program has caught the attention of music industry celebrities such as Common and DJ Khaled, who are now supporters of the program.

=== Contagious ===
Jassy is part of the hip-hop band Contagious, one of four official inmate music groups at San Quentin that perform at various yard shows, graduations and events inside the prison during the year. Jassy is the primary songwriter and front man of the band, which also includes prisoners Paul Comauex (vocals), Lee Jaspar (on guitars), Kevin Sawyer (on keyboards), and James Benson (on drums). Contagious is under the supervision of prison staff and technician Raphaele Casale.

=== TEDxSanQuentin ===
In 2017, Jassy was invited to a special TEDx entitled TEDxSanQuentin. He performed his composition "Freedom" inspired by his own experience. Jassy wrote it when he was stuck in his cell during a lockdown at Solano Prison years earlier. Jassy’s son was in the audience. The filmed event was uploaded on April 20, 2017.

=== Productions ===
Jassy also worked on his own materials and released remixes including "Freedom" from The Game which he entitled "Freedom (Dreams Remix)". He also created beats for the acclaimed prison podcast Ear Hustle producing music from an influx of younger men who came into San Quentin.

== Discography ==
=== Albums ===
Navigators

- 1999: Daily Life Illustrators (reached #27 on Swedish Albums Chart)

Track list:

- "Come Into My Life"
- "Superstar"
- "I Remember"
- "Get a Life"
- "Something's Wrong"
- "Dreams"
- "All Over"
- "Believe In Yourself"
- "Blue Hill"
- "Set Sail"
- "Snakes"
- "If You Where Here Tonight"

=== Singles ===
Navigators

- 1998: "Come into My Life" (reached #31 on Swedish Singles Chart)
- 1998: "I Remember" (reached #46 on Swedish Singles Chart)
- 1999: "Superstar" (reached #20 on Swedish Singles Chart)

Solo

- 2009: "Exit"
- 2017: "Freedom" (released 13 May 2018)

=== Collaborations (albums / singles) ===
- 2004: "Blah Blah Blah" (single by Vanessa Struhler featuring David Jassy)
- 2007: "Be Good to Me" by Ashley Tisdale featuring David Jassy (taken from her album Headstrong)
  - "Not Like That" (written by David Jassy produced by Twin)
- 2007: "Body Language" by Heidi Montag (written by David Jassy)
- 2008: Flashback (album by Darin Zanyar with six songs on the album written by David Jassy):
  - "Karma" (single written by and featuring David Jassy)
  - "Runaway" (single written by David Jassy)
  - "Strobelight", "Flashback", "Roadtrip" (other songs on album written by David Jassy)
- 2008: "Outta Control" by VFactory (written and featuring David Jassy)
- 2009: "Love Struck" by VFactory (written by David Jassy, Darin and produced by Swedish production team Twin)
- 2009: Guilty Pleasure, an album by Ashley Tisdale – album co-produced by David Jassy
  - "It's Alright, It's OK" (single from same album – song co-written by David Jassy)
  - "Crank It Up (second single includes vocals by David Jassy)
  - "Watcha Waitin For" (written by David Jassy produced by Twin)
  - "Acting Out" (written by David Jassy and produced by Twin)
- 2009: "What If", an anti-bullying song by Friends featuring Darin (written by David Jassy and produced by Twin)
- 2009: "Got Skillz", "Pooltable","Okay" and "Match Made in Heaven" (Ilya featuring David Jassy)
- 2010: "Pyramid" by Charice featuring Iyaz (written by David Jassy produced by Twin)
