= Not Like That =

Single by Ashley Tisdale

from the album Headstrong
- Released: January 25, 2008
- Recorded: 2006
- Length: 3:02
- Label: Warner Bros.
- Songwriters: Joacim Person; Nicolas Molinder; Pette Ankarberg; David Jassy; Ashley Tisdale
- Producer: Twin

Ashley Tisdale singles chronology
"He Said She Said" (2007)	"Not Like That" (2008)	"Suddenly" (2008)

Music video
- "Not Like That" on YouTube

"Not Like That" is a song recorded by American singer Ashley Tisdale for her 2007 debut album, Headstrong. "Not Like That" was released as the album's third single on January 25, 2008, in Europe. The single was later released in Chile and Brazil, in April and August 2008, respectively. "Not Like That" was Tisdale's first single to not be released in North America. The single had a physical release in Europe and Chile, with two editions of the single being released, with different track listings and remixes. Lyrically the song deals with life in the entertainment business.

The song received a generally positive reception from music critics. Commercially, the song became another hit for Tisdale in Germany, where her previous single, "He Said She Said" had entered the top 20. The song also became her second top 40 hit in Austria, and had success in Sweden as well. Tisdale performed the song on the set of Good Morning America, after performing her previous singles "Be Good to Me" and "He Said She Said". The performance was not broadcast, however, and was only available for the studio audience. Tisdale also performed the song on Live With Regis and Kelly, with part of the performance being broadcast. The song was also performed on Tisdale's "Headstrong Tour Across America".

== Background and composition ==
"Not Like That" (2007)

"Not Like That" features several different writers, including David Jassy, Joacim Person, Nicolas Molinder and Tisdale herself. Twin also serves as the producers of the song, while Victoria Sandstrom provides backing vocals. The song was recorded in 2006, along with the majority of Tisdale's debut album. During an interview with MTV in March 2007, Tisdale confirmed the song would be the album's third single. The album was released as a physical CD in Europe on January 25, 2008, slightly over a year after Tisdale's previous single, "He Said She Said" was released. The physical copy of the single came in two version. The maxi CD single featured the album version of the song, along with the Jack D. Elliot remixes of both "He Said She Said" and "Be Good to Me". The music video for "Not Like That" is also included. The second CD single features the album version of "Not Like That", and the Jack D. Elliot remix of "Be Good to Me".

Tisdale said that the song is about "how people often see the glamorous side of this career [...] It's really saying it's not like that and I'm just the girl next door. There's always somebody who either loves you or hates you, and you just have to have a thick skin". "Not Like That," which contains influences of Middle Eastern music, covers the topic of the "familiar misunderstood-celebrity," but was referred to as more "worked up" than "whiny." Containing rap interludes by Tisdale and clap along beats, according to Gary Graff of Billboard, the song is also liking to Gwen Stefani.

== Reception ==
Jamie Ross of Arizona Daily Wildcat said "Tisdale hits the right note with the out-of-this-world song "Not Like That." The up-tempo number features clap-along beats, white girl rhymes and lyrics every girl who has ever been to a club can relate to. Commercially, the song became another hit for Tisdale in Germany, where her previous single, "He Said She Said" had entered the top 20. The song also became her second top 40 hit in Austria, and had success in Sweden as well.

== Music video ==
The music video was leaked on October 2, 2007. It is the second part of the There's Something About Ashley DVD. The music video intro features Tisdale's sister Jennifer Tisdale. The video was directed by Scott Speer. The music video starts with Tisdale to read a magazine that a friend gives her. The magazine's cover story is about Tisdale. We see her in her room singing, at work—filming a commercial—and in a magazine. Josh Henderson, Scott Speer, and Jared Murillo, make cameos in the video.

== Track listings ==
Maxi CD single

1. "Not Like That" (Album Version) – 3:01
2. "He Said She Said" (Jack D. Elliot Remix) – 3:05
3. "Be Good to Me" (Jack D. Elliot Remix) – 6:17
4. "Not Like That" (Music Video) – 3:10

2-tracks CD single

1. "Not Like That" (Album Version) – 3:01
2. "Be Good to Me" (Jack D. Elliot Remix) – 6:17

== Charts ==
Chart (2008)	Peak position
Austria (Ö3 Austria Top 40)	31
Czech Republic (Rádio – Top 100)	52
Eurochart Hot 100 Singles	68
German Singles Chart	20
Swiss Music Charts	27

== Release history ==
Release dates and formats for "Not Like That"
Region	Date	Format	Label	Ref.
Germany	January 25, 2008	CD single	Warner Bros.	

== Credits and personnel ==
- Lead vocals – Ashley Tisdale, David Jassy
- Producer – Twin
- Vocal producer – Twin
- Writer (s) – Ashley Tisdale, David Jassy, Nicolas Molinder, Pell Ankarberg, Joacim Person
- Mixer and additional programming – Alan Mason
- Background vocals – Victoria Sandstrom

== Covers and samples ==
Indonesian singer Vicky Shu sampled the music of the song for her single "Mari Bercinta", translating to "Let's Have Sex". The song was featured on her album Drink Me, was released on October 11, 2010, and was recorded on August 6, 2010.
