= Suddenly (Ashley Tisdale song) =

Single by Ashley Tisdale

from the album Headstrong
- B-side: "Who I Am"; "It's Life"
- Released: May 2, 2008
- Length: 3:40
- Label: Warner Bros.
- Songwriters: Ashley Tisdale; Janice Robinson
- Producer: Guy Roche

Ashley Tisdale singles chronology
| "Not Like That" (2008) | "Suddenly" (2008) | "I Want It All" (2008) |

Music video
- "Suddenly" on YouTube

"Suddenly" is a single from Ashley Tisdale's debut album Headstrong, the song was released in Germany on May 2, 2008, as her fourth single there. The song was not released in the United States, and was her debut album's final single.

== Composition ==
"Suddenly" (2008)
The piano is the main instrument used in the song.

The song is written by Tisdale and Janice Robinson and is produced by Guy Roche. She performed the song the first and only time at the 75th Rockefeller Christmas Tree on New York City, United States. Music Beat moderately positively reviewed the song, though they claim Tisdale's vocals are not strong enough for a big ballad.

== Music video ==
The video was directed by Scott Speer and released on November 6, 2007 as the last part of the There's Something About Ashley DVD. In the video Tisdale appears singing in a fictitious concert front of a white background. It also shows moments of the DVD in the process of recording, in this part Kara DioGuardi makes a cameo, Tisdale in different moments of her life and also during the tour of High School Musical: The Concert, at the end of the video she invites the boy (Josh Henderson, to her dressing room, she was interested in the boy before and knew him in the start of the trilogy in the video "He Said She Said".

== Track listings ==
Maxi CD single

1. "Suddenly" (Album version) – 3:40
2. "Who I Am" (Non-album track) – 3:17
3. "It's Life" (Non-album track) – 3:47
4. "Suddenly" (Music video) – 4:09

2-tracks edition

1. "Suddenly" (Album version) – 3:40
2. "Who I Am" (Non-album track) – 3:17

== Charts ==
| Chart (2008) | Peak position |
|---|---|
| German Singles Chart | 45 |

== Credits and personnel ==
- Lead vocals – Ashley Tisdale
- Producer – Guy Roche
- Engineer – Dushyant Bhakta
- Writers – Ashley Tisdale, Janice Robinson
- Mixer and additional programming – Mick Guzauski
- Background vocals – Janice Robinson
- Piano and synths – Bruce Dukov, Guy Roche

== Release history ==
Release dates and formats for "Suddenly"
| Region | Date | Format | Label | Ref. |
|---|---|---|---|---|
| Germany | May 2, 2008 | CD single | Warner Bros. | |
