= Tooth Tunes =

Toothbrush featuring music

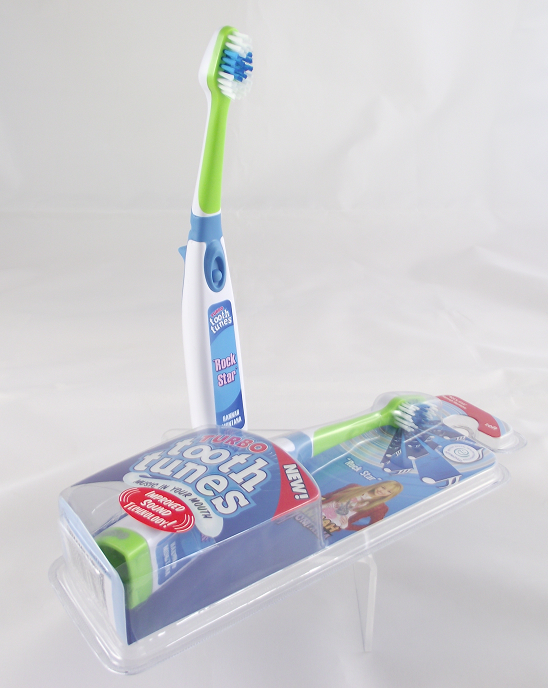
Tooth Tunes brush which plays a Hannah Montana song

Tooth Tunes is a discontinued line of children's toothbrushes released by the Tiger Electronics division of Hasbro in 2007. Each brush played a two-minute song clip from a particular artist to encourage the user to brush their teeth for the dentist-recommended two minutes. A single toothbrush came with one song, and had a manufacturer's suggested retail price of US$9.99. Two more types, Turbo Tooth Tunes and Tooth Tunes Junior, were introduced in 2008. In 2012, nine new Tooth Tunes toothbrushes were introduced.

Once activated, a small CPU in the handle played the featured song on the chip by transferring vibrations through the bristles, which acted as transducers, into the front teeth, through the jawbone, and into the inner ear. During use, the user heard a mix between a natural vocal hum and the song being played.

Andrew Filo, one of the toothbrush's inventors, said that he worked on the project because of his childhood fascination with his ability to hear himself humming.
