= Johan Alkenäs =

Swedish songwriter and producer (born 1974)

- Born: Carl Johan Axel Alkenäs; May 13, 1974 (age 52); Sweden
- Education: Örebro Kulturskola
- Occupations: Songwriter and producer
- Spouse: Johanna Alkenäs

Carl Johan Axel Alkenäs (born May 13, 1974) is a Swedish songwriter and producer. He studied at Örebro Kulturskola and has authored or produced a great number of songs worldwide many becoming charting hits. He collaborated closely with the Swedish songwriter Joacim Persson and with Niclas Molinder (both of the production team known as Twin) and has co-written a number of soundtracks for Disney films.

== Career ==
Alkenäs was involved in a number of soundtracks primarily for Disney films. He co-wrote "Rotten to the Core" for the US telefilm Descendants, and the theme songs for the US TV show Jonas L.A. and Teen Beach 2. He was involved in co-writing themes and songs for a number of US TV shows like Gamer's Guide to Pretty Much Everything, A.N.T. Farm, Pair of Kings, Lab Rats, the follow-up Lab Rats: Elite Force and Raven's Home. He co-wrote "Gonna Get This" for the series Hannah Montana. The song was performed by Miley Cyrus.

Alkenäs has collaborated internationally with Ashley Tisdale in "What If", "Crank It", "Acting Out" and "Masquerade", he co-wrote "Calling All the Monsters" for China Anne McClain, "Determinate" for Bridgit Mendler, "Run, Run, Run" for the German band Tokio Hotel, "Walking Away" for Turkish/Macedonian-born singer Sibel, "Pyramid" for Charice (known now as Jake Zyrus), "On Fire" for Swiss singer Stefanie Heinzmann and "What If" by Swedish singer Darin, "愛投羅網" (Ài Tóu Luó Wǎng) for Taiwanese artist Show Lo and many others.

Alkenäs has also been involved in co-writing songs for Eurovision Song Contest, notably the 2017 Serbian entry "In Too Deep" by Tijana Bogićević and the 2018 Austrian entry "Nobody but You" by Cesár Sampson.
