= Mike Smith (music executive) =

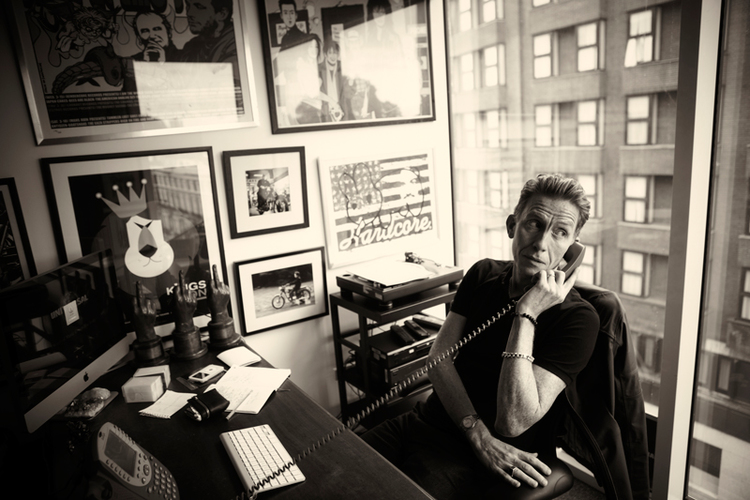
- Occupation: Global president of Downtown Music Publishing
- Years active: 1988-present

Mike Smith is the global president of Downtown Music Publishing, a division of Downtown Music Holdings. Prior to this move, Smith was Managing Director at Warner/Chappell Music UK, part of the global music publishing arm of Warner Music Group.

== Early career ==
Smith launched his career as an A&R scout at MCA Publishing in 1988, where he signed Blur, Levitation, and discovered the Smashing Pumpkins. In 1992, he joined EMI Publishing, signing prominent acts like PJ Harvey, Elastica, Supergrass, Teenage Fanclub, Doves, Starsailor, the Beta Band, the Avalanches, Gorillaz, the White Stripes, the Libertines, Scissor Sisters, Arcade Fire, and Arctic Monkeys. He also resigned Blur during this period and advanced to the role of Head of A&R. He also worked with artists such as Robbie Williams, the Verve and Beth Orton.

== Columbia Records ==
Smith moved to Columbia Records UK in 2006 to work as the Managing Director. In his first year there, he signed Mark Ronson and Calvin Harris. Other signings included the Ting Tings, MGMT, the Hugs, the Gossip, Glasvegas, Miike Snow, Magnetic Man, Miles Kane, Paul Epworth, Band of Horses, Katy B, the Vaccines and Ryan Adams. Acts he also looked after included Kings of Leon, Bruce Springsteen, Bob Dylan, Foo Fighters, Matt Cardle, Ke$ha, Sleigh Bells, and Kasabian.

== Mercury Records ==
In April 2012, Smith left Columbia to take up the role of President of Music at Mercury Records where he oversaw the signings of Iggy Azalea, the Vamps and Slaves, as well as signing Duke Dumont and the Strypes. With the formation of Virgin / EMI Records in 2013, from the merger of Virgin Records and Mercury Records, he signed the Chemical Brothers, the Libertines, Barns Courtney and Squeeze.

== Warner/Chappell Music ==
In 2016, Smith left Virgin/EMI to take up the position of Managing Director at Warner/Chappell UK, the longest established major international music publishing company. Its diverse roster runs from Noël Coward and George Gershwin to Skepta and Stormzy. As well as reuniting with Damon Albarn, since joining the company he has overseen the signings of Liam Gallagher, J Hus, Dave, Andy Partridge, Joe Strummer, the Manic Street Preachers and Celeste.

In November 2016, Smith was the inaugural recipient of the George Martin Award at the Music Business Worldwide A&R Awards.

== Downtown Music Publishing ==
In September 2020, Smith joined Downtown Music Publishing as Global President where he is responsible for a catalogue that includes John Lennon, Trampolene, Miles Davis, Oneohtrix Point Never, Arca, George Gershwin, Wu-Tang Clan and the 1975.

== Personal life ==
Since 2010, Smith has been a trustee of the charity New Deal of the Mind, which works to encourage job creation within the creative industries.

Smith has been sketching the musicians he has spent his lifetime watching and in 2009, staged an exhibition of prints made from these drawings at Richard Goodall Gallery in Manchester. This was followed up in 2011 with a comprehensive show of his paintings, light boxes and prints at Somerset House. A further exhibition of the work was staged at Metropolis Group studios.
