= What If (Ashley Tisdale song) =

Promotional single by Ashley Tisdale

from the album Guilty Pleasure
- Released: July 7, 2009
- Recorded: 2008
- Length: 4:23
- Label: Warner Bros.
- Songwriters: Ashley Tisdale, Kara DioGuardi, Niclas Molinder, Joacim Persson, Nick Paul, Johan Alkenäs
- Producer: Twin

"What If" is a song by Ashley Tisdale from her second studio album, Guilty Pleasure. It was released on July 7, 2009 as part of an iTunes Store countdown in promotion for the album.

== Song information ==
This song was co-written by Tisdale, Kara DioGuardi and the Swedish production team Twin. Tisdale described "What If" as the most personal track on the album and said the song "is about when you’re in a relationship and you say 'If I really needed you, would you actually be there?’" It was released as part of the Guilty Pleasure countdown on iTunes on July 7, 2009 in the United States and Canada.

== Critical reception ==
The song received mixed to unfavorable reviews from music critics. Rudy Klapper from Sputnikmusic said the "cheese factor in What If is almost unbearably high" and that the song contained "high-school journal lyrics". Bill Lamb from About.com stated that the song "wants to evolve into an Avril Lavigne ballad but ultimately drowns in too many lyrical "babys" and polished string-based crescendos.

== Charts ==
| Chart (2009) | Peak position |
|---|---|
| U.S. Billboard Bubbling Under Hot 100 Singles | 1 |

== Release details ==
| Region | Date | Label | Format |
|---|---|---|---|
| Canada | July 7, 2009 | Warner Music | Digital download (iTunes) |
| United States | July 7, 2009 | Warner Music | Digital download (iTunes) |
