= It's Alright, It's OK (Ashley Tisdale song) =

Single by Ashley Tisdale

from the album Guilty Pleasure
- B-side: "Guilty Pleasure"
- Released: April 13, 2009
- Recorded: March 2008
- Genre: Pop rock
- Length: 2:59
- Label: Warner Bros.
- Songwriters: Niclas Molinder; Joacim Persson; Johan Alkenäs; David Jassy
- Producers: Twin; Alke

Ashley Tisdale singles chronology
"I Want It All" (2008)	"It's Alright, It's OK" (2009)	"Crank It Up" (2009)

Music video
- "It's Alright, It's OK" on YouTube

"It's Alright, It's OK" is a song by Ashley Tisdale from her second studio album, Guilty Pleasure. The song was written by Niclas Molinder, Joacim Persson, and David Jassy, while Molinder and Persson also produced the track. It was released as the album's lead single in Canada on April 13, 2009, being released in other countries in the following week. A CD single was released in numerous countries, including the United States, Canada, Germany, and the United Kingdom. Lyrically, the song's theme of heartache and a bad relationship are similar to her previous works, as well as several other tracks featured on Tisdale's second album.

The single received positive critical feedback for its catchy production and lyrical message, as was the change in musical direction. The song became Tisdale's fourth single to chart on the Billboard Hot 100, where it peaked at number 99. It became her first Top 20 hit on the Hot Dance Club Play chart, peaking at number 19, her highest peak to date on the chart. The song fared better in other territories, entering the Top 40 in both Sweden and on the Eurochart Hot 100 Singles. "It's Alright, It's OK" was Tisdale's first top five hit in Austria, and is her highest-peaking single to date in the country. The song was Tisdale's third to enter the Top 20 in Germany, and is her highest-peaking single in that country as well. The song's music video features Tisdale finding out that her boyfriend is cheating on her, so she decides to hook up with various men and take pictures with them. She later trashes her ex-boyfriend's house and lets him find the pictures. Various shots of Tisdale and her band performing the song at a party are also shown.

Tisdale promoted the single mainly through live performances, most of which were televised. The song was performed on American talk shows such as Good Morning America and The Today Show, while Tisdale also promoted the song with live performances at international show's including Wetten, dass..? and at Los Premios MTV Latinoamérica 2009. DJ Cansis recorded a dance cover version of the song, under the title "OK Alright". The cover version was released in Europe in 2010, and was later featured on the Love2Club compilation album in the country. The track is the theme song of the German television show "Die Schulermittler".

== Background and composition ==
"It's Alright, It's OK" (2009)
"It's Alright, It's OK".

"It's Alright, It's OK" was written by top songwriter/producer Joacim Persson, Niclas Molinder and produced by Swedish music production team Twin. On the song's message, Tisdale said the song "is a strong, empowering song that kind of helps you move on" and continued to say, "I have definitely on and with someone you really like, if they are cheating on you, you don't want to believe it. But, unfortunately, you either stay in the relationship and keep getting hurt because it keeps happening or you get up and you move on. You don't look back". The song was released as the album's lead single on April 14, 2009, in the United States in airplay and digital formats. Tisdale premiered the single on On Air with Ryan Seacrest. She described the song as a message she wanted to get across the other girls. The song was played on KIIS-FM in Los Angeles and WIHT in Washington, D.C. The official remixes were by Dave Audé, Johnny Vicious, Jason Nevins and Von Doom; the Audé remix used a sample of Depeche Mode's "Personal Jesus" as most of the backing track, and the Von Doom remix used one of "Hot n Cold" by Katy Perry. The song is included in the compilation albums The Dome Summer 2009 and Bravo Hits Vol.66.

The song is a spunky break-up anthem about being single and in control of your life for the first time.— "I love break-up songs," Tisdale admits during the press release of the single. She described the song as a message she wanted to get across the other girls.

== Critical reception ==
Nick Levine of Digital Spy said:

'It's Alright, It's OK', the lead single from album number two, is certainly a step in the right direction. It sees Tisdale come across like Kelly Clarkson's spunky little sister, delivering an "I'm so much better without you" message over a radio-friendly pop/rock backing. There's nothing remotely original here, but the big chanty chorus hits the spot like a slice of pizza after a heavy night out..

Stephanie Bruzzese of Commonsense Media stated:

Her message about lost love will undoubtedly strike a chord with many of her young fans who've experienced their own heartaches. The uncomplicated lyrics give an honest yet clean account of getting over someone who's deceived you....Cookie-cutter is the term that comes to mind when listening to this track...Tisdale's voice is passable exceptional...The mildly catchy hooks sound a lot like those in Kelly Clarkson's single "My Life Would Suck Without You", but because Tisdale's vocal chops are nowhere near as strong as Clarkson's, this single lacks overall oomfph.".

== Chart performance ==
The song debuted on the Billboard Hot 100 chart of May 2, 2009, at number 99. In May 2009, the song debuted on the Canadian Hot 100 at number 85 and then climbed at number 74 due to high downloads. The song entered the Eurochart Hot 100 Singles at number 43 and then rose to number 38 in its third week. In the United Kingdom, the song reached the number 104. In Germany, the song debuted at number 13 and later rose to number 12, and in Austria the song peaked at number five. The song stayed on the Austrian and German chart for 16 and 11 consecutive weeks. The song entered the Czech Singles Chart at number 76 and peaked at number 37 and stayed on the chart for 31 consecutive weeks, making it the song's longest run.

== Music video ==
The music video was shot on March 24, 2009, in a Beverly Hills mansion and directed by Scott Speer, the music video features Adam Gregory, as Tisdale's ex-boyfriend who cheats on her. In the video, the man who has supposedly cheated on Tisdale leaves his house and she finds a key, so she goes into his house. There she takes photographs with Edilson Nascimento, Christopher Mason and other Brazilian male models, as well as Scott Speer. She then throws a party there, where her band then stages a performance on platforms in the swimming pool. At the end of the video, the man that cheated on her, comes home with the 'second' girlfriend (portrayed by Brittany Snow) and they find a camera with a note with "It's Alright, It's OK" written in it (made by Tisdale). His "second" girlfriend then leaves him. The video premiered on MySpace and Entertainment Tonight. The music video was shown in 6,600 movie theaters in the United States from April 24 to May 28.

== Live performances ==
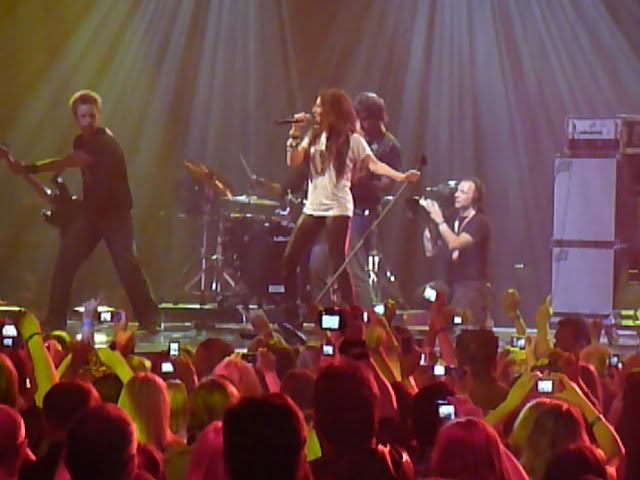
Tisdale Performing the song at Comet Awards in Germany.

On May 17, 2009, Tisdale performed for first time the song at the special 2009 KISS Concert hosted by WXKS-FM of Boston, Massachusetts. Tisdale performed the song for the annual award ceremony of the Viva Comet Awards, celebrated in Cologne, Germany on May 29, 2009. During her first promotional tour of her album and her clothes line Puerco Espin for Europe, she sang the song on June 9, 2009, at TRL Italy in Rimini, Italy and Operación Triunfo in Madrid, Spain on June 11, 2009, also in Spain she performed it for the German TV show Wetten, dass..? on June 13, 2009.

Her first live performance for U.S. TV was in ABC's Good Morning America, where she performed the track along with "Masquerade" on June 16, 2009, as part of the anticipated promotion for her second album. In the release week of Guilty Pleasure, Tisdale sang "It's Alright, It's OK" in several American TV shows such as NBC's Today Show and ABC's The View. Also, the song was included in the track list for her free concerts across United States, and she recorded live versions of the song for AOL Sessions and Walmart Soundckeck. On August 21, 2009, she was invited to perform the song in the NBC's show America's Got Talent. On October 4, 2009, she was guest star in an episode of Extreme Makeover: Home Edition, here she performed the song too. On October 15, 2009, Tisdale was part of the ceremony awards with this song at Los Premios MTV Latinoamérica 2009.

== Track listing ==
Maxi CD

1. "It's Alright, It's OK" (Album Version)—2:59
2. "Guilty Pleasure" (Non-Album Track)—3:16
3. "It's Alright, It's OK" (Dave Audé Club Mix)—6:58
4. "It's Alright, It's OK" (Johnny Vicious Club Mix)—7:58
5. "It's Alright, It's OK" (Enhanced Music Video)—3:15

2-Track single

1. "It's Alright, It's OK" (Album Version)—2:59
2. "Guilty Pleasure" (Non-Album Track)—3:16

Remixes EP

1. "It's Alright, It's OK" (Dave Audé Radio)—3:57
2. "It's Alright, It's OK" (Johnny Vicious Radio)—3:19
3. "It's Alright, It's OK" (Von Doom Radio)—4:15

Wal-Mart CD single

1. "It's Alright, It's OK" (Album Version)—2:59
2. "It's Alright, It's OK" (Enhanced Music Video)—3:15

== Charts ==
Chart (2009)	Peak position
Austria (Ö3 Austria Top 40)	5
Canada (Canadian Hot 100)	74
Czech Airplay Chart	37
Europe (Eurochart Hot 100 Singles)	38
Finland (Finnish Singles Chart)	20
Germany (Official German Charts)	12
Slovak Airplay Chart	79
Swedish Singles Chart	38
Swiss Singles Chart	30
UK Singles (Official Charts)	104
US Billboard Hot 100	99
US Billboard Hot Dance Club Play	19
US Billboard Pop 100	71

=== Year-end charts ===
Chart (2009)	Position
Austria (Ö3 Austria Top 40)	70

== Credits and Personnel ==
Song credits

- Lead vocals – Ashley Tisdale
- Producer – Twin and Alke
- Vocal producer – Kelly Levesque
- Writer (s) – Niclas Molinder, Joacim Persson, Johan Alkenäs, David Jassy
- Background vocals – Sibel Redžep
- Recording engineer – Brian Summer
- Assistant mix engineer – Matty Green
- Guitarist (s) – Joacim Persson, Johan Alkenäs
- Bass – Niclas Bosson

CD single credits

- Executive Producers – Lori Feldman, Tom Whalley
- A&R – Tommy Page
- Art Direction – Julian Peploe
- Photography – Roberto D'Este

== Release history ==
Region	Date	Label	Format
Canada	April 13, 2009	Warner Bros. Records	Digital download, CD single
United States	April 14, 2009	Warner Bros. Records	Digital download, CD single
Spain	April 14, 2009	Warner Bros. Records	Digital download, CD single
Chile	April 14, 2009	Warner Bros. Records	Digital download
Hungary	April 15, 2009	Warner Bros. Records	Digital download, CD single
France	April 16, 2009	Warner Bros. Records	Digital download, CD single
Germany	May 16, 2009	Warner Bros. Records	Digital download, CD single
United Kingdom	April 14, 2009	Warner Bros. Records	Digital download, CD single
Mexico	May 22, 2009	Warner Bros. Records	Digital download, EP

== Cover version ==
- In 2010 The song was covered by the DJ Cansis on a dance version called "OK Alright", and was included in the compilation album Love2Club, along with others Europeans hits singles.
