= Be Good to Me =

Single by Ashley Tisdale

from the album Headstrong
- B-side: "Who I Am"; "It's Life"; "Last Christmas"
- Released: December 26, 2006
- Genre: Pop; R&B
- Length: 3:34; 3:14 (radio edit)
- Label: Warner Bros.
- Songwriters: Kara DioGuardi; Joacim Persson; Niclas Molinder
- Producer: Twin

Ashley Tisdale singles chronology
"Be Good to Me" (2006)	"He Said She Said" (2007)

Music video
- "Be Good to Me" on YouTube

"Be Good to Me" is the debut single recorded by American singer Ashley Tisdale, released in the United States on December 26, 2006 by Warner Bros. Records as the lead single from her debut studio album, Headstrong (2007). It was written by Kara DioGuardi, Joacim Persson and Niclas Molinder, and produced by Twin. The album version features uncredited rap vocals by Swedish musician David Jassy.

== Composition and reception ==
The song debuted on AOL Music: First Listen on December 22, 2006. The song was featured on the album, Radio Disney Jams, Vol. 10 (2008).

The song describes relationship problems between the singer and a man; however, she wants to fix the relationship rather than end it. The song is a mid-tempo dance track that features an additional rap segment leading up to the bridge.

Music critics had varied opinions on the single. Some praised its catchy melody and urban beat, while others were unimpressed with Tisdale's vocal skills.

It is featured in the film Bring It On: In It to Win It, and in the video game Thrillville: Off the Rails, both released in 2007. On the iTunes Store, the song was released as a double A-Side with "He Said She Said". The song was later released as a CD single. The song is featured in the children's toothbrush, Tooth Tunes.

== Music videos ==
The music video, directed by Chris Marrs Piliero, was shot on the set of the tour, High School Musical: The Concert (2006-2007). Tisdale's same backup dancers from the tour were used in the performance for the video. Tisdale wearing a blue sequined tank top with denim shorts, runs down and dances around a blue rusted bridge, surrounded by her four backup dancers. A large screen in the background also switches between vibrant color designs. The video uses the radio edit of the song, which does not feature rap vocals by David Jassy. The video premiered as a "first look" on MTV's Total Request Live on April 19, 2007.

A new version of the video premiered on Germany's Viva on November 18, 2008. The video shows the same performance footage and home videos of Tisdale. The rap version of the song is used in the video.

== Chart performance ==
The song debuted on the Billboard Hot 100 chart of February 17, 2007, at number 96. It rose to number 80 the following week before exiting, spending a total of two weeks on the chart and has been certified gold by the Recording Industry Association of America for equivalent sales of 500,000 units in the United States. The song was released in Europe in the fall of 2008, and peaked at 67 in Austria and at number 57 in Germany.

== Charts ==
Chart (2007–08)	Peak position
Austria (Ö3 Austria Top 40)	67
Germany (GfK)	57
US Billboard Hot 100	80
US Pop 100	68
Venezuela Pop Rock (Record Report)	4

=== Year-end charts ===
Chart (2007)	Position
Brazil (Crowley)	72

== Track listings and formats ==
2-track edition

1. "Be Good to Me" (radio edit) – 3:14
2. "Be Good to Me" – 3:33

Limited maxi edition

1. "Be Good to Me" – 3:33
2. "Who I Am" (non-album track) – 3:17
3. "It's Life" (non-album track) – 3:47

Brazilian digital single

1. "Be Good to Me" (radio edit) – 3:14

German maxi CD single

1. "Be Good to Me" (radio edit) – 3:14
2. "Last Christmas" – 3:56
3. "Be Good to Me" (Jack D. Elliot Mix) – 6:17
4. "Be Good to Me" (music video)

German limited CD single

1. "Be Good to Me" (radio edit) – 3:14
2. "Last Christmas" – 3:56

Digital remix EP

1. "Be Good to Me" (radio edit) – 3:14
2. "Be Good to Me" (Jack D. Elliot Mix) – 6:17
3. "Be Good to Me" (Eddie Baez Anthem Club) – 6:51
4. "Be Good to Me" (SugarDip Edit) – 5:03
5. "Be Good to Me" (Scalfati from T.H.C. - Scalfonzo Pop Extended Mix) – 7:23
6. "Be Good to Me" (Scalfati from T.H.C. - Scalfonzo Pop Mixshow) – 5:00
7. "Be Good to Me" (LSDJ from T.H.C. - Good 4 U Extended Mix) – 6:13
8. "Be Good to Me" (LSDJ from T.H.C. - Good 4 U Mixshow) – 5:26
9. "Be Good to Me" (karaoke version) – 3:14

== Certifications ==
Region	Certification	Certified units/sales
United States (RIAA)	Gold	500,000^{‡}
^{‡} Sales+streaming figures based on certification alone.

== Credits and personnel ==
- Vocals – Ashley Tisdale, David Jassy
- Producer – Kara DioGuardi
- Vocal producer – David Jassy
- Writer(s) – Kara DioGuardi, David Jassy, Joacim Persson, Niclas Molinder, Ashley Tisdale
- Mixer and additional programming – Twin
- Background vocals – Kara DioGuardi

== Release history ==
Release dates and formats for "Be Good to Me"
Region	Date	Format	Label	Ref.
United States	March 6, 2007	Contemporary hit radio	Warner Bros.	
Germany	October 24, 2008	CD single; digital download	Warner Bros.	
