= He Said She Said (Ashley Tisdale song) =

Single by Ashley Tisdale

from the album Headstrong
- B-side: "Headstrong"; "Be Good to Me"; "Last Christmas"
- Released: January 15, 2007
- Recorded: 2006
- Studio: Chalice Recording Studios (Los Angeles, CA)
- Genre: Pop; R&B
- Length: 3:08
- Label: Warner Bros.
- Songwriters: J. R. Rotem; Evan "Kidd" Bogart; Ryan Tedder
- Producer: J. R. Rotem

Ashley Tisdale singles chronology
| "Be Good to Me" (2006) | "He Said She Said" (2007) | "Not Like That" (2008) |

Music video
- "He Said She Said" on YouTube

"He Said She Said" is a song recorded by American singer Ashley Tisdale. The song was written by J. R. Rotem, Evan "Kidd" Bogart, and Ryan Tedder, and produced by Rotem for Tisdale's debut studio album Headstrong (2007). The song was first recorded in 2006 at Chalice Recording Studios in Los Angeles, California. It was released later that year for digital download, and was officially released as a single on January 15, 2007, as the second international single. The song was later released in the United States on February 5, 2007. A CD single was released in both territories, featuring remixes of the song and her previous single, "Be Good to Me". In 2009, a "MegaRemixes" edition of the single was released for digital download, and featured 16 remixes of the single. "He Said She Said" features musical elements of pop and R&B.

The single received a mixed reception from music critics, who praised its catchy melody and dance-pop production, but criticized its lyrical content and Tisdale's vocal delivery. However, the song had moderate commercial performance. It is Tisdale's most successful single in the United States, peaking at number 58 on the Billboard Hot 100. The song also reached number 37 on the Pop Songs chart and number 21 on the Hot Dance Club Play chart. The single was later certified Platinum by the RIAA for sales of 1,000,000 copies. The song also charted in countries such as Canada and the United Kingdom, though it failed to have much success in either country. The song performed best in Australia and Germany, where it reached the top 40 and top 20, respectively. Tisdale promoted the single mainly through live performances. She performed the song on the High School Musical: The Concert tour, along with other songs from Headstrong. The song was also featured on the setlist of Tisdale's Headstrong Tour Across America, a mall tour throughout the United States. Tisdale also performed the track on television shows such as Good Morning America, Live With Regis and Kelly, and The Early Show.

== Background ==
In 2006, following the success of the musical film High School Musical, Tisdale began working on her debut studio album. "He Said She Said" was recorded at Chalice Recording Studios in Los Angeles, California. Tisdale worked with writers such as J.R. Rotem and Ryan Tedder on the song, while Rotem also served as the producer for the track. Evan "Kidd" Bogart also helped write the song.

The single has received numerous releases between 2006 and 2009. It was first released for digital download on December 19, 2006 as a promotional extended play along with remixes and her debut single "Be Good to Me". The EP was available for purchase at the High School Musical: The Concert. "He Said She Said" was officially released as her second single on January 15, 2007 in international territories. On November 6 of the same year, the single was released in the United States for radio airplay. The single was released physically in both Europe and the US in 2007. In 2009, a "MegaRemixes" edition of the album was released for digital download, which featured 16 remixes of the single.

== Composition ==
"He Said She Said"
"He Said She Said" combines elements of pop.

"He Said She Said" incorporates pop and contemporary R&B with elements of dance-pop and pop rap. Heather Phares of allmusic said that the song "features a hard-hitting beat and backing vocals". Tammy La Gorce, in an editorial review of Headstrong on Amazon.com, stated the song is "a steamy dancefloor seduction that ought to come with a PG-15 rating."

== Critical reception ==
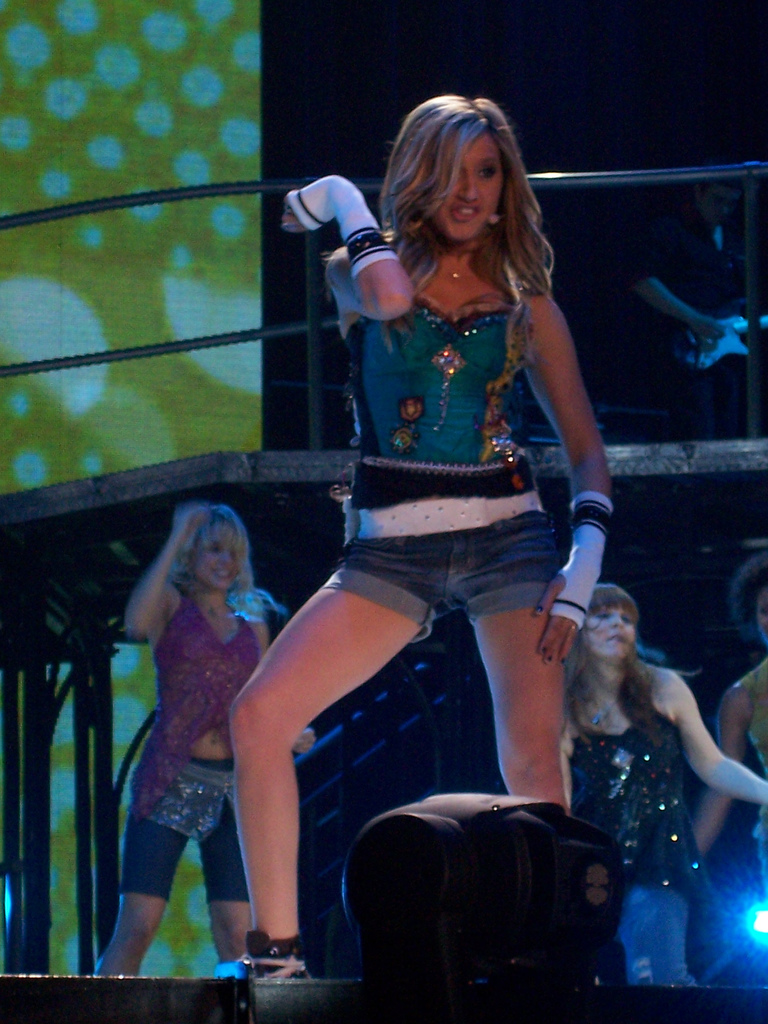
Tisdale Performing the song in the High School Musical: The Concert

Upon its release, "He Said She Said" received mixed critical reviews. Nick Levine of Digital Spy said "Sadly, 'He Said, She Said' fails to capitalize on Tisdale's onscreen charisma. With its Phantom of the Opera-style organ intro, fractured beat and smoothly cooing chorus, it sounds like a Destiny's Child album track from the early noughties." David Sanford of About.com said was generally positive about the song, albeit critical of the "MegaRemixes" release, commenting "Sometimes a song comes out that is upbeat and fun from the gate and really needs nothing added on to make it better. This is the case with Ashley Tisdale's "He Said She Said." As the song begins to make inroads at radio, remixes have been commissioned by a slew of top mixers like Friscia & Lamboy and Morgan Page amongst others. Unfortunately, few of them are able to maintain that poppy excitement of the original version." Later in the year, however, the website said of the song "Her first major pop chart hit is an uptempo pop/dance gem."

In reference to the song's lyrics, "Common Sense Media" stated "Parents need to know that Ashley Tisdale's tween-friendly pop is appealing and bright. The lyrics are family-safe, but unsubstantial, flirting around the edges of sexual innuendo on a couple of tracks like "He Said She Said" is an adorable tune about flirtation, the sexiest on the album ("Baby I can see us movin' like that/Baby I can see us touchin' like that"). Unfortunately, pedestrian rhymes and constant repetition of musical and lyrical hooks keep the poetry from taking flight." "He Said She Said" ranked number 81 in About.com's Top 100 Pop Songs of 2007 list and #99 in Z100's top 100 songs of 2007 list.

== Chart performance ==
"He Said She Said" is one of Tisdale's most successful singles to date. The single debuted on the U.S. Billboard Hot 100 at number 77 on January 27, 2007 for 2 weeks and re-entered the chart a year later in 2008 at number 97, then rose to number 58 in the following week for eight non-consecutive weeks. The song was Tisdale's first Top 40 entry in the Pop Songs chart, where it peaked at number 37. It was also Tisdale's first song to chart on the Hot Dance Club Play, where it peaked at number 21. The song has since been certified Platinum by the RIAA. In Canada, the song failed to have much success, peaking at number 62. On the Eurochart Hot 100 Singles, the song came to a peak of number 65 on the chart, and remained her highest charting single on the chart until her 2009 single "It's Alright, It's OK" peaked at number 38. In Australia, the song became Tisdale's first to enter the Top 40 in the country, peaking at number 21 on the chart. The song had the most success on the German Singles Chart, where it reached number 17, her first Top 20 chart entry in the country. It stayed on the chart for 15 weeks.

== Music video ==
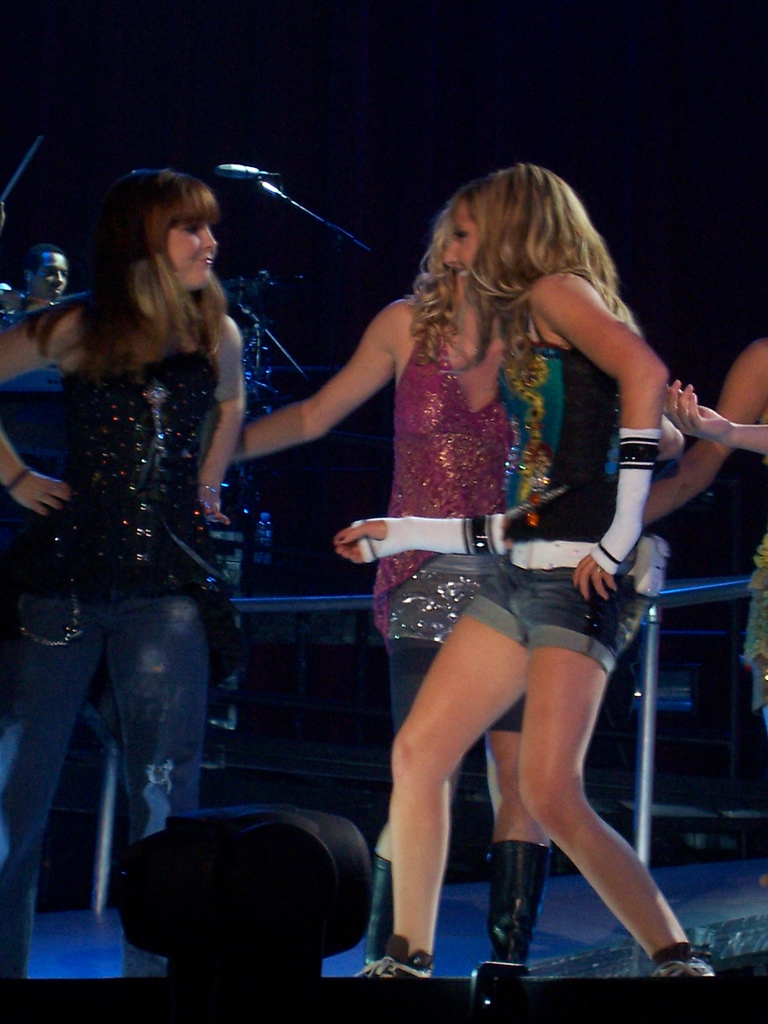
Tisdale performing the song in the High School Musical: The Concert

Scrapped version

The first video for "He Said She Said" was filmed on January 25, 2007. In the video, Tisdale is in a high school. She becomes attracted to a male student and does various things to impress him. Tisdale enters a classroom, and starts to daydream. Then the class room turns into a nightclub. She starts having a dance-off with the mean girls from her school, and at the end, dances with the object of her affection. Tisdale has mentioned on a YouTube video that for the first scene of the video, she slammed a locker door so hard that it could not be reopened for a retake. She has also stated that there was originally supposed be a kissing scene in the video, but it has been removed for the purpose of her younger fans. The first version was directed by Chris Applebaum. It has been confirmed by Tisdale herself in a YouTube video that video was scrapped.

Official version

In June 2007, Tisdale filmed the song's second music video which was directed by Scott Speer. The new video is the first part of the DVD There's Something About Ashley. In the video, Tisdale and her friends go to a club, where a man played by the actor Josh Henderson, notices her. She starts to dance with her friends and looks after the man. Her older sister Jennifer Tisdale appears in the music video. The world premiere of the video was on MTV's Total Request Live on September 19, 2007. And in Australia her video clips entered at number #10 on the top 10 request list for channel v in July 2010 and in the second day it was at number #8 then feel down to number #9 and then it short up to number #4 for 5 weeks.

== Live performances ==
Tisdale performed the song in the High School Musical: The Concert alongside the songs "Headstrong" and "We'll Be Together". Tisdale also performed the song on several television shows such as Good Morning America, Live with Regis and Kelly, The Early Show and TRL. The song was used in a Red by Marc Ecko and Degree Girl commercial which she appeared in. She performed the song at her free mall tour, Headstrong Tour Across America.

== Track listings and version ==
U.S. Digital single (2006)

1. "He Said She Said" (Radio Disney Edit) – 3:07
2. "Headstrong" (Album Version) – 3:06

U.S. Digital single #2
Canadian CD single

1. "He Said She Said" (Radio Disney Edit) – 3:07
2. "Be Good to Me" (Radio Disney Edit) – 3:14

European CD single

1. "He Said She Said" (Album Version) – 3:08
2. "He Said She Said" (Von Doom Mixshow) – 6:00
3. "He Said She Said" (Redtop Edit) – 4:59
4. "Last Christmas" (Single Version) – 3:55

MegaRemixes Edition

1. "He Said She Said" (Von Doom Mixshow) – 5:59
2. "He Said She Said" (Von Doom Club Remix) – 7:15
3. "He Said She Said" (Von Doom Radio Edit) – 4:12
4. "He Said She Said" (Redtop Edit) – 4:58
5. "He Said She Said" (Redtop Edit Club Mix) – 7:22
6. "He Said She Said" (Jack D. Elliot Radio Mix) – 3:39
7. "He Said She Said" (Morgan Page Club Edit) – 4:57
8. "He Said She Said" (Morgan Page Club) – 7:16
9. 'He Said She Said" (Morgan Page Dub) - 7:17
10. "He Said She Said" (Funky Junction & Antony Reale Radio Edit) – 3:17
11. "He Said She Said" (Friscia & Lamboy's Club) – 8:08
12. "He Said She Said" (Friscia & Lamboy's Dub) – 7:33
13. "He Said She Said" (Friscia & Lamboy's Mixshow) – 6:07
14. "He Said She Said" (DJ Gomi's Radio Vox) – 4:43
15. "He Said She Said" (Funky Junction & Korovon Club Mix) – 4:55
16. "He Said She Said" (Karaoke Version) – 3:08
17. "He Said She Said" (Friscia & Lamboy's Radio) – 3:49

He Said She Said The EP

1. "He Said She Said" (Album Version) – 3:08
2. "Headstrong" (Album Version) – 3:12
3. "Last Christmas" (Single Version) – 3:55

== Credits and personnel ==
Song Credits

- Lead vocals – Ashley Tisdale
- Producer – J. R. Rotem
- Vocal producer – Greg Ogan
- Writer (s) – J. R. Rotem, Evan "Kidd" Bogart, Ryan Tedder
- Mixer and additional programming – Phil Tan
- Background vocals – Élan Luz Rivera
- Additional editing – Josh Houghkik

== Charts ==
=== Weekly charts ===
| Chart (2007–08) | Peak position |
|---|---|
| Austria (Ö3 Austria Top 40) | 21 |
| Canadian Digital Song Sales (Billboard) | 69 |
| Eurochart Hot 100 Singles | 65 |
| Germany (Official German Charts) | 17 |
| UK Singles (OCC) | 155 |
| US Billboard Hot 100 | 58 |
| US Hot Dance Club Songs (Billboard) | 21 |
| US Mainstream Top 40 (Billboard) | 37 |

== Certifications ==
| Region | Certification | Certified units/sales |
|---|---|---|
| United States (RIAA) | Platinum | 1,000,000^{‡} |
^{‡} Sales+streaming figures based on certification alone.

== Release history ==
Release dates and formats for "He Said She Said"
| Region | Date | Format | Label | Ref. |
|---|---|---|---|---|
| United States | December 12, 2006 | Digital download | Warner Bros. | |
| Canada | January 12, 2007 | CD single | Warner Bros. | |
| Germany | October 26, 2007 | CD single | Warner Bros. | |
| United States | November 6, 2007 | Contemporary hit radio | Warner Bros. | |
