= Headstrong (Ashley Tisdale album) =

Studio album by Ashley Tisdale
- Released: February 6, 2007
- Recorded: late 2005–late 2006
- Genres: Pop; R&B
- Length: 44:58
- Label: Warner Bros.
- Producers: J. R. Rotem; The Matrix; Bryan Todd; Ryan Tedder; Michael Smith; Guy Roche; Twin; Scott Spock; Shelly Peiken; Emanuel Kiriakou

Ashley Tisdale chronology
Headstrong (2007)	Guilty Pleasure (2009)

Singles from Headstrong
- 1. "Be Good to Me" Released: December 26, 2006; 2. "He Said She Said" Released: January 12, 2007; 3. "Not Like That" Released: January 25, 2008; 4. "Suddenly" Released: May 2, 2008

Headstrong is the debut album by American singer Ashley Tisdale, released on February 6, 2007, by Warner Bros. Records. Tisdale began working on the project after the first installment of High School Musical (2006). Tisdale described her work on the album; "…I didn't really know who I was and I was trying to figure out who to do. I now am way more comfortable in my own skin." The performer worked with a variety of established writers and producers on the album, including Diane Warren, J.R. Rotem, Ryan Tedder, Evan "Kidd" Bogart, Bryan Todd and Kara DioGuardi, among others. Commenting that the album garnered its title from her personality, Tisdale said she wanted to use her first album to formally introduce herself "personally", and not as one of the several characters she is known for.

Headstrong's style derives mainly from the genres of pop, hip-pop and contemporary R&B, backed by electronica. Additionally, the album incorporates hip hop beats, while some tracks infuse dancehall and some styles of world music. The album, lyrically, discusses themes central to modern teen pop, such as broken hearts, crushes and self-confidence. Many music critics compared this first effort to the debut albums of fellow Disney Channel-alums Britney Spears and Christina Aguilera. Carrying primarily an urban-pop tone, the "hip pop" of Gwen Stefani was also said to be an influence on the album. Headstrong, itself, received mixed reviews from critics, who — while complimenting it overall — called it "ordinary" and panned the ballads. Critics were also unimpressed to ambivalent regarding Tisdale's vocal skills. Regardless, the album debuted at number five on the Billboard 200, selling over 64,000 copies in its opening week. It was later certified gold by both the RIAA and the Irish Recorded Music Association.

The album's lead single, "Be Good to Me," charted moderately in the United States and select European markets; the second single from the album, "He Said She Said," peaked at #58 in the US and appeared on several international charts, peaking within the top 20 in Germany and Austria. The last two singles were released exclusively in certain European countries. The third single, "Not Like That" charted in the top half of several European charts, while the fourth and final single "Suddenly" charted in Germany. Tisdale supported the album with promotional appearances, High School Musical: The Concert, and her tour, Headstrong Tour Across America. The album was ranked as the #6 best album of 2007, by the readers of Billboard Magazine.

== Background and development ==
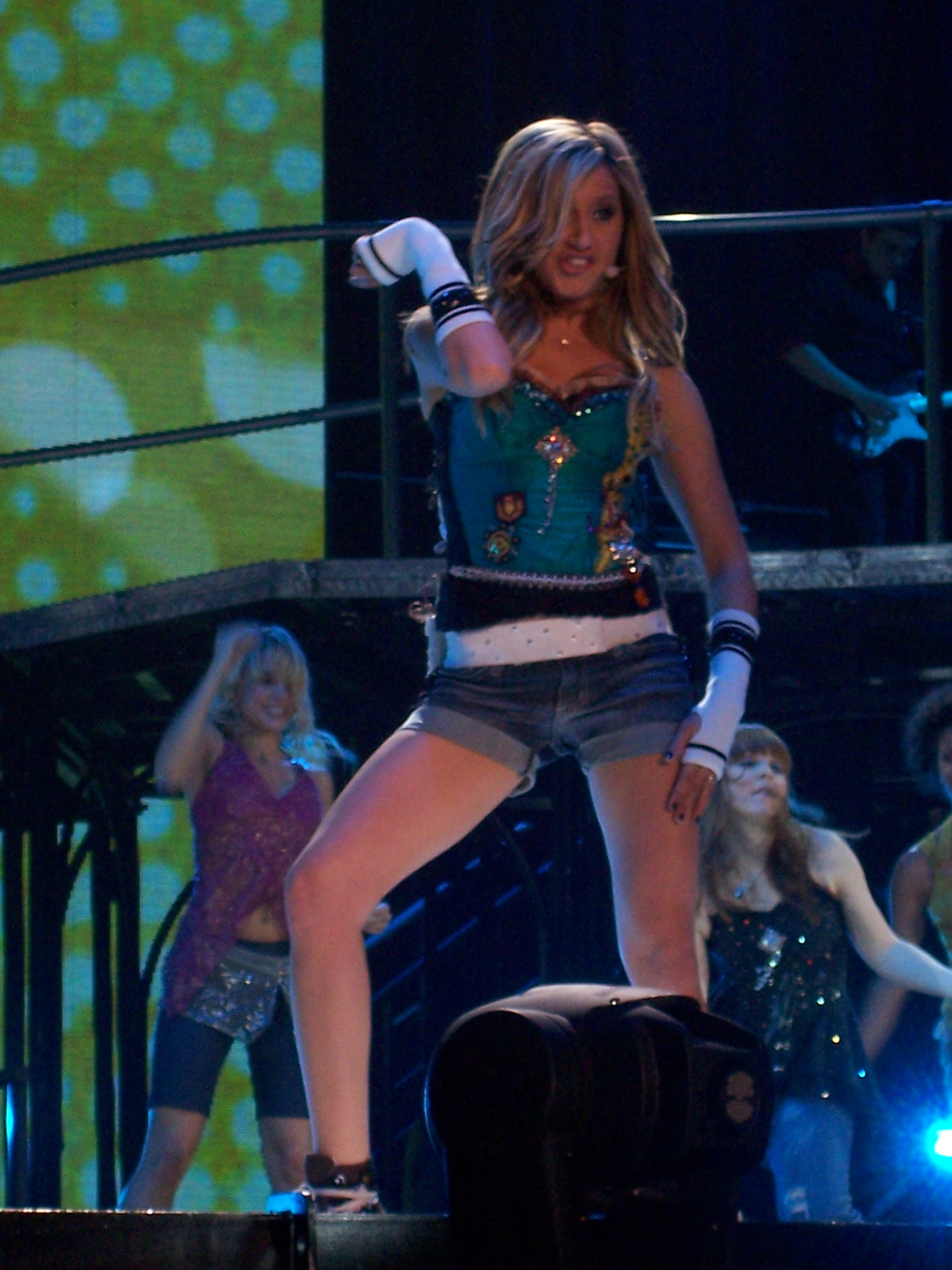
Tisdale performing "He Said She Said" during High School Musical: The Concert

Tisdale got her first start on Billboard when she became the first female artist in history to debut with two songs on the Billboard Hot 100, from the soundtrack of High School Musical. Tisdale called the feat "crazy," stating, "When I think about artists like Madonna and Beyoncé...it's surreal. I seriously can't comprehend it." Soon after the completion of High School Musical, Tisdale began work on her debut album. In December 2006, producer J.R. Rotem confirmed he was producing and writing with Tisdale for the album.

"I want people to know that I'm a real person, and that I’ve been through normal situations, like crushes and heartbreaks. I think hearing my stories will help the audience relate better to me."

— Ashley Tisdale on the conception of Headstrong

Tisdale said that the album was an opportunity for her fans to get to know her better, commenting, "People know my characters, but they don't know me." Noting that she never spills much information about her life in interviews, she also said that the album talks about life and things personal to her. Regarding the previous statement, the singer said she wanted people to understand that she was normal, and how they could relate to her. Tisdale titled the album Headstrong, because she calls herself a "headstrong" type of person, commenting that she was the term in the sense of knowing how she wants to look, sing, and come across. In addition to wanting to record songs that "touched" her and those that she could personally identify with, she co-wrote three songs on the album, "Over It," "Not Like That," and "Suddenly."

"Don't Touch (The Zoom Song)" is a cover song, originally performed by Tata Young, while the Diane Warren-penned "Love Me for Me" was originally a leftover track recorded by American girl group Dream for their 2003 album Reality, however it was left unreleased. It would later be recorded and popularized by South African girl group Jamali. Tisdale collaborated with Rotem, Ryan Tedder, and Evan "Kidd" Bogart on "He Said She Said." Tisdale also worked heavily with production teams The Matrix and Twin. Additionally, Diane Warren, David Jassy, Guy Roche, Shelly Peiken, Sarah Hudson, Samantha Jade, and Bryan Todd were the other remaining music veterans that worked on the project, with the rest being relatively unknown writers. While the album does not contain credited featured artists, Jassy, Jack D. Elliot, Keely Pressly, Lauren Christy, Scott Spock, Graham Edwards, Kara DioGuardi, Victoria Sandstorm, Windy Wagner, Bryan Todd, Tata Young, and Marissa Pontecorvo provide background vocals on tracks. Jassy performed rap interludes on "Be Good to Me," which he co-wrote. The album was released in the United States on February 6, 2007.

== Composition ==
"Be Good to Me"
A 24-second sample of "Be Good to Me," a fusion of pop and R&B featuring an urban beat.

Headstrong derives mainly from the genres of pop, electropop, and R&B while incorporating dance-pop themes and hip hop and dancehall elements. It carries many elements of hip pop itself, and has been compared to the music of Gwen Stefani. The title track "Headstrong" mixes "slinky" verses with cheerleader chants like Stefani's "Hollaback Girl." The album begins with a "futuristic" introduction which contains excerpts of other songs on the set. "So Much For You" is a dance song about a confident girl who wants true love. "He Said She Said" has been described as "steamy dancefloor seduction." "Be Good to Me" contains an urban beat. "Not Like That," which contains influences of Middle Eastern music, covers the topic of the "familiar misunderstood-celebrity," but was referred to as more "worked up" than "whiny." Containing rap interludes by Tisdale and clap along beats, according to Gary Graff of Billboard, the song is also liking to Stefani. "Positivity" makes use of syncopated beats and "old-school" synths. "Over It" has "boingy" effects. "Goin' Crazy" has similarities to Britney Spears' "(You Drive Me) Crazy," while "Suddenly" seems to cover Tisdale discovering her stardom. Jon Dolan of Blender coined the song "The Little Mermaid-worthy." Spears is also said to be an influence of Tisdale's "husky, alto" voice in "Over It," and "So Much For You." The dance song "Don't Touch (The Zoom Song)" has an '80's style beat.

== Promotion ==
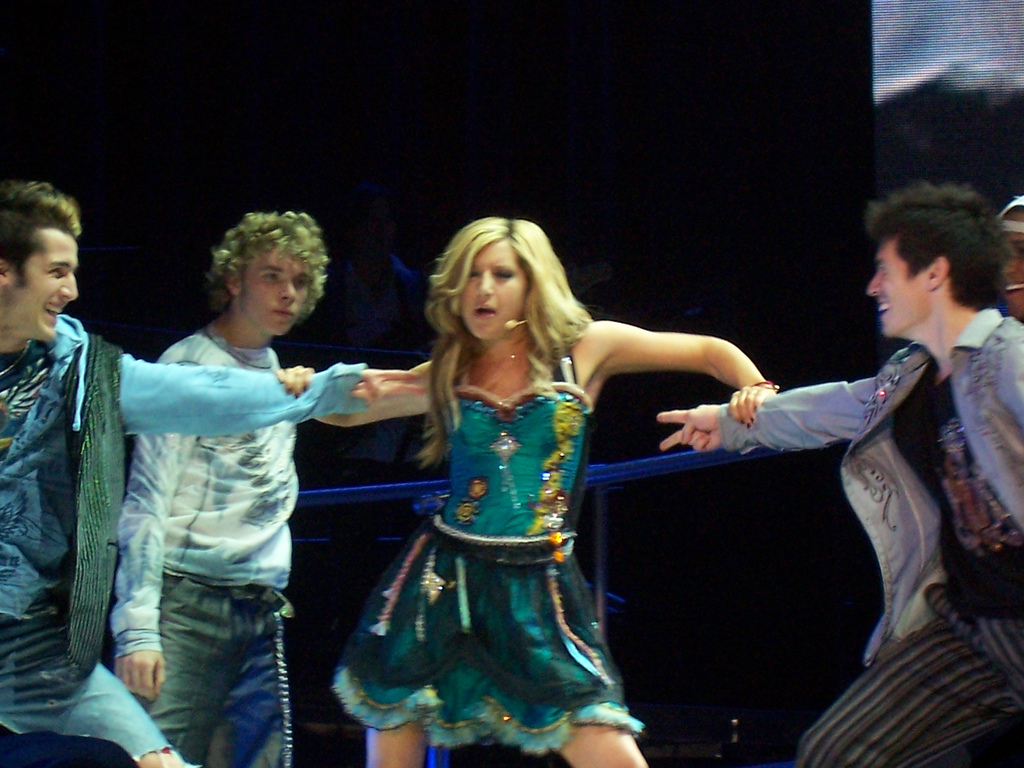
Tisdale, flaunted by background dancers, performing "Headstrong" during High School Musical: The Concert

To promote the album, Tisdale appeared in several live and televised appearances, performing the singles, "Be Good to Me" and "He Said She Said." On February 6, 2007, she appeared and performed on Good Morning America, and appeared at a signing at FYE in West Nyack, New York. The following day when the album was released, she performed on Live With Regis and Kelly. On February 8, 2007, she appeared in the studios of WPIX and KTLA for their respective morning news shows. Tisdale also appeared at a Verizon Wireless store in Pasadena, California on February 10, 2007, to promote the set. She also performed "He Said She Said" on The Early Show. Additionally, Tisdale performed cuts from the album during her solo set list on High School Musical: The Concert. On October 22, 2007, Tisdale co-hosted MTV's TRL. During the winter, she performed at Christmas at Rockefeller Center, Z100's Jingle Ball, Y100's Jingle Ball, and Q102's Jingle Ball.

=== Singles ===
The album's lead single, "Be Good to Me" was released to mainstream airplay as the album's lead single on March 6, 2007. It was originally released as a B-side for the promo release of "He Said She Said." The single peaked at number 80 on the Billboard Hot 100, while reaching 67 in Austria and 57 in Germany. The second single, "He Said She Said," originally released as a promo single for the album, was sent to mainstream radio on November 6, 2007. The single peaked at 58 in the United States, 21 in Austria, 17 in Germany, and 62 in Canada. It was later certified Gold in the United States by the Recording Industry Association of America for shipments of over 500,000 copies. "Not Like That" served as the third single in several European countries, first released on January 25, 2008. It peaked in the top 20 of Germany, top 30 in Switzerland, and at number 31 in Austria. The fourth and final single from Headstrong was "Suddenly," which select European markets also received. It was released on May 2, 2008, and peaked at 45 in Germany.

=== Headstrong Tour Across America ===
Headstrong Tour Across America
- Tour by Ashley Tisdale
- Location: United States
- Associated album: Headstrong
- Start date: October 14, 2007
- End date: December 22, 2007
- Legs: 1
- No. of shows: 10

Ashley Tisdale concert chronology
- High School Musical: The Concert (2006); Headstrong Tour Across America (2007)

Headstrong Tour Across America was the debut concert tour by American recording artist Ashley Tisdale to promote the album. The backstage of the tour were shown on DVD There's Something About Ashley.

Date	City	Venue
United States
October 14, 2007	Columbus, OH	Polaris Fashion Place
October 16, 2007	Chicago, IL	Orland Square Mall
October 17, 2007	Milwaukee, WI	Southridge Mall
October 18, 2007	Bethesda, MD	Westfield Montgomery
October 20, 2007	East Garden City	Roosevelt Field Mall
October 23, 2007	Philadelphia, PA	Willow Grove Park Mall
October 25, 2007	Nashville, TN	Opry Mills
October 29, 2007	Minneapolis, MN	Mall of America
October 30, 2007	Independence, MO	Independence Center
November 1, 2007	Dallas, TX	Stonebriar Centre

== Critical reception ==
Professional ratings
Review scores
Source	Rating
AllMusic	3/5 stars
Blender	2.5/5 stars
USA Today	2.5/4 stars

Heather Phares of AllMusic rated the album 3 out of 5 stars and commented, "her voice is pleasant enough, but it's not especially distinctive, and she's not helped by a batch of songs that aren't nearly as charming as High School Musical's tunes." Phares also said that although the album wasn't winning considering the high-profile songwriters and producers involved, "it's fine for anyone who just wants to hear more of Ashley Tisdale's — and not Sharpay Evans' — singing." Jon Dolan of Blender said Tisdale did not import her "spunky" High School Musical character in the album, and that even with the quality of producers, "no stylistic slipper fits right." Gary Graff of Billboard said Tisdale went, "the contemporary CHR school of fellow Mouse products Britney Spears and first-album Christina Aguilera — lots of synthesizer-laden, beat-heavy, layered-vocal dance tracks" that varied between "come-hithers" and "self-affirming anthems." Graff commented, "she'll have to develop a more defined identity before she can truly win our affections." James Ross of The Arizona Daily Wildcat commended the album's uptempo songs but critiqued the ballads, commenting she hits the right notes on uptempo numbers, while on ballads, "Any 'Musical' fan knows that Tisdale can belt one out, but this is not apparent on the album." Overall, Ross said, "Although the album fails in places, it is ll [sic] a worthy attempt by an up-and-coming pop artist to please her audience."

== Commercial performance ==
The album debuted at number five on the Billboard 200 in the US, selling over 64,000 copies in its first week. On June 3, 2008, the album was certified Gold by the Recording Industry Association of America (RIAA) for sales of over 500,000 units. The album sold over 564,000 copies in United States as of July 13, 2009 and 1.1 million copies worldwide as of February 2010. The album debuted on the Austrian Albums Chart at number 33, and after its fifth week on the chart, it peaked at 21. In its opening week on New Zealand Albums Chart and the Swiss Albums Chart, it peaked at 22 and 98, respectively. On the Australian Albums Chart, it peaked at 80, while spending 33 weeks on the German Albums Chart, peaking at 23. Headstrong also peaked at 155 on the UK Albums Chart and 16 on the Irish Albums Chart, and was later certified Gold in the latter region by the Irish Recorded Music Association.

== Track listing ==
Headstrong track listing
No.	Title	Writer(s)	Producer(s)	Length
1.	"Intro"		Jack D. Elliot	1:05
2.	"So Much for You"	Adam Longlands, Lauren Christy, Scott Spock, Graham Edwards	The Matrix	3:05
3.	"He Said She Said"	J. R. Rotem, Evan "Kidd" Bogart, Ryan Tedder	Rotem	3:08
4.	"Be Good to Me"	Kara DioGuardi, Joacim Persson, Niclas Molinder	Twin	3:33
5.	"Not Like That"	Persson, Molinder, Pelle Ankarberg, David Jassy, Ashley Tisdale	Twin	3:01
6.	"Unlove You"	Guy Roche, Shelly Peiken, Sarah Hudson	Roche	3:29
7.	"Positivity"	Roche, Peiken, Samantha Jade	Roche	3:44
8.	"Love Me for Me"	Diane Warren	Emanuel Kiriakou	3:45
9.	"Goin' Crazy"	Persson, Molinder, Ankarberg, Celetia Martin	Twin, Roche	3:09
10.	"Over It"	Tisdale, Bryan Todd, Michael "Smidi" Smith	Todd, Smith	2:54
11.	"Don't Touch (The Zoom Song)"	Adam Anders, Nikki Hassman, Rasmus Bille Bahncke, Rene Tromborg	Anders, Supaflyas	3:11
12.	"We'll Be Together"	Peiken	Mark Hammond	4:00
13.	"Headstrong"	Longlands, Spock, Christy, Edwards	The Matrix	3:11
14.	"Suddenly"	Janice Robinson, Tisdale	Roche	3:39
Total length:				44:58

Japanese bonus track
No.	Title	Writer(s)	Producer(s)	Length
15.	"Be Good to Me" (Scalfati from T.H.C. Scalfonzo Pop Mixshow)	DioGuardi, Persson, Molinder	Twin (Original), Scalfati (Remix)	5:01

Walmart exclusive edition bonus tracks
No.	Title	Writer(s)	Producer(s)	Length
15.	"Who I Am"	Bryan Todd, Anton Bass, Michael "Smidi" Smith	Todd, Bass, Smith	3:18
16.	"It's Life"	Ashley Tisdale, Shelly Peiken, Mark Hammond	Hammond	3:47

Walmart revised edition
No.	Title	Writer(s)	Producer(s)	Length
17.	"Be Good to Me" (Scalfati from T.H.C. Scalfonzo Pop Mixshow)	DioGuardi, Persson, Molinder	Twin (Original), Steven Scalfati (Remix)	5:01

US iTunes Store and international digital special edition bonus tracks
No.	Title	Writer(s)	Producer(s)	Length
15.	"I Will Be Me"	Todd, Smith, Sean Holt, TJ Stafford	Todd, Smith	3:16
16.	"He Said She Said" (karaoke version)	Rotem, Bogart, Tedder	Rotem	3:08
17.	"Be Good to Me" (karaoke version)	DioGuardi, Persson, Molinder	Twin	3:14

European special edition bonus DVD
No.	Title	Length
1.	"Behind-the-Scenes Ashley Tisdale Footage"	24:34

US Ultimate Holiday Gift Edition bonus DVD
No.	Title	Length
1.	"There's Something About Ashley – The Music Video Trilogy"	12:08
2.	"The Life and Times of Ashley Tisdale – The Documentary"	46:42

- Note: The opening "Intro" track is only found on physical releases of the album.

Samples

- "Be Good to Me" contains an uncredited sample of "Feelgood Lies" by German girl-group No Angels, written by Pelle Ankarberg, Charlie Dore, Niclas Molinder, Maryann Morgan and Joacim Persson.
- "Unlove You" is a cover of the song by Sarah Hudson, released in 2004.
- "Goin' Crazy" is a cover of the song "All Eyes on You" by Sandy Mölling, released in 2004.
- "Don't Touch (The Zoom Song)" is a cover of the song "Zoom" by Tata Young, released in 2006.

== Personnel ==
Credits adapted from Headstrong at Allmusic.

- Lead vocals – Ashley Tisdale, David Jassy
- Background vocals – David Jassy, Jack D. Elliot, Keely Pressly, Lauren Christy, Scott Spock, Graham Edwards, Kara DioGuardi, Victoria Sandstorm, Windy Wagner, Bryan Todd, Tata Young, Marissa Pontecorvo
- Keyboards – Rasmus Billie Bähncke
- Bass – Adam Anders
- Guitar – Adam Anders, Emanuel Kiriakou and Joacim Persson

Production

- Executive Producers: Lori Feldman and Tom Whalley
- Vocal Producers: Adam Anders and Nikki Hassman
- Mastering: Chris Gehringer
- Mastering Assistant: Will Quinnell
- Engineers: Adam Anders, Rasmus Billie Bähncke, Dushyant Bhakta, Stuart Brawley, Steve Churchyard, Joe Corcoran, Dave Dillbeck, Kara DioGuardi, Chris Holmes, Emanuel Kiriakou, Alan Mason, The Matrix, Greg Ogan and Twin
- String Arranger: David Campbell
- Assistant Engineers: Tom Bender and Cliff Lin
- A&R: Tommy Page
- Photography: Mark Liddell & Brian Bowen Smith
- Art Direction: Ellen Wakayama
- Design: Julian Peploe

== Charts ==
=== Weekly charts ===
Chart (2007)	Peak position
Australian Albums (ARIA)	80
Austrian Albums (Ö3 Austria)	21
German Albums (Offizielle Top 100)	33
Irish Albums (IRMA)	16
Italian Albums (FIMI)	76
New Zealand Albums (RMNZ)	22
Swiss Albums (Schweizer Hitparade)	98
Taiwanese Albums (Five Music)	8
UK Albums (OCC)	155
US Billboard 200	5

=== Year-end charts ===
Chart (2007)	Position
US Billboard 200	196

== Certifications ==
Region	Certification	Certified units/sales
Argentina (CAPIF)	Gold	20,000^{^}
Brazil	—	23,000
Ireland (IRMA)	Gold	7,500^{^}
United States (RIAA)	Gold	500,000^{^}
