= Crank It Up (Ashley Tisdale song) =

Single by Ashley Tisdale

from the album Guilty Pleasure
- B-side: "Time's Up"; "Blame It on the Beat"
- Released: October 9, 2009
- Recorded: 2009
- Genre: Pop; electropop
- Length: 3:01
- Label: Warner Bros.
- Songwriter(s): Niclas Molinder; Joacim Persson; Johan Alkenäs; David Jassy
- Producer(s): Twin; Alke

Ashley Tisdale singles chronology
"It's Alright, It's OK" (2009)	"Crank It Up" (2009)	"Voices in My Head" (2018)

Music video
- "Crank It Up" on YouTube

"Crank It Up" is a song by Ashley Tisdale from her second studio album, Guilty Pleasure. The song was released as the album's second single on October 9, 2009. The single had no official release in the United States and Canada. The song features uncredited vocals by David Jassy.

== Song information ==
"Crank It Up"
The song contains electronic elements as well as the use of the Auto-tune effect.

The song is included on Tisdale's second studio album Guilty Pleasure. The single was released in October 2009 and is included in the German compilation album Popstar Hits. She performed the song in several live shows such as Popstars. The song received mixed reviews from music critics, who complimented its catchiness, while others called it unoriginal and dismissed the overuse of Auto-Tune.

== Music video ==
The music video is directed by Scott Speer and was filmed on the week of September 28, 2009 in Los Angeles. The video begins with Tisdale in a black outfit with black wings on her back in a room. Before she sings, there is a metronome moving to the beat of the song and a turntable playing, it also shows her in the same black outfit while walking along a hallway and singing. Then towards the second verse, she is in a light yellow dress and is standing near a wall. Then at the second chorus, she is at a party singing and dancing next to a man. Towards the end of the song she is seen in her light yellow dress standing on a table with people sitting around it. Justin Baldoni and Wesley Quinn make cameos. The video premiered on VIVA Germany on October 5, 2009 and on Myspace on October 6, 2009, to mixed reviews. Some critics praised its visual style, while others dismissed it as unoriginal. E! Entertainment said that "Tisdale wants to dance, and not in that G-rated, Disney-fied way, either, in this video. We see her practicing some sexy moves, seductive looks and various hand-to-hair gestures after watching. Fortunately, all that preparation eventually pays off, and she finally makes it onto the dance floor".

== Track listing ==
CD Maxi Single

1. "Crank It Up" (Single Version) – 3:01
2. "Time's Up" (Non-album Track) – 3:25
3. "Blame It on the Beat" (Non-album Track) – 3:28

International Digital Single

1. "Crank It Up" (Single Version) – 3:01
2. "Time's Up" (Non-album Track) – 3:28

== Chart performance ==
The song has appeared in the Austrian for five consecutive weeks and in the German charts for nine non-consecutive weeks.

Chart (2009)	Peak position
Austria (Ö3 Austria Top 40)	22
Eurochart Hot 100 Singles	66
Germany (GfK)	19

== Credits and personnel ==
Song credits

- Vocals – Ashley Tisdale, David Jassy
- Producer – Twin and Alke
- Writer (s) – Niclas Molinder, Joacim Persson, Johan Alkenäs and David Jassy.
- Chorus – David Jassy
- Background vocals – Freja Jonsson-Blomberg
- Recording engineer – Brian Summer
- Mix engineer – Jonnie "Most" Davis
- Guitarist (s) – Joacim Persson and Johan Alkenäs

CD Single credits

- Executive producers – Lori Feldman and Tom Whalley
- A&R – Tommy Page
- Art Direction – Julian Peploe
- Management – Bill Perlman
- Photography – Roberto D'Este

== Release details ==
Region	Date	Label	Format	Catalog
France	October 9, 2009	Warner Bros. Records	EP	9362497825
Chile	October 9, 2009	Warner Bros. Records	Digital download	47263-6
Finland	October 12, 2009	Warner Bros. Records	Digital download	
Germany	October 9, 2009	Warner Bros. Records	Digital download	9362497825
Germany	October 16, 2009	Warner Bros. Records	CD single	9362497825
Europe	October 17, 2009	Warner Bros. Records	CD single, digital download	9362497825
Argentina	October 26, 2009	Warner Bros. Records	Digital download	
