= Guilty Pleasure (Ashley Tisdale album) =

Studio album by Ashley Tisdale
- Released: June 12, 2009
- Recorded: April 2008–March 2009
- Genres: Pop; pop rock
- Length: 49:13
- Label: Warner Bros.
- Producers: Josh Alexander; Alke; Heather Bright; Deekay; Dreamlab; Pop & Oak; Toby Gad; Chris Garcia; Kapari; Emanuel Kiriakou; Kelly Levesque; Papa Justifi; Play; Billy Steinberg; Twin

Ashley Tisdale chronology
Headstrong (2007)	Guilty Pleasure (2009)	Symptoms (2019)

Singles from Guilty Pleasure
- 1. "It's Alright, It's OK" Released: April 13, 2009; 2. "Crank It Up" Released: October 9, 2009

Guilty Pleasure is the second studio album by American recording artist Ashley Tisdale. It was released on June 12, 2009, by Warner Bros. Records. The lead single from the album, "It's Alright, It's OK", was officially released in Canada on April 13, 2009. The second single from Guilty Pleasure, "Crank It Up" was released on October 9, 2009, in Europe.

Guilty Pleasure received mixed reviews from music critics, who appreciated her attempt to break free from her Disney image and complimented the album's energy and catchiness, while others dismissed the production and songwriting as generic and unoriginal. The album debuted at number 12 on the Billboard 200, selling 25,000 copies in its first week.

== Background and release ==
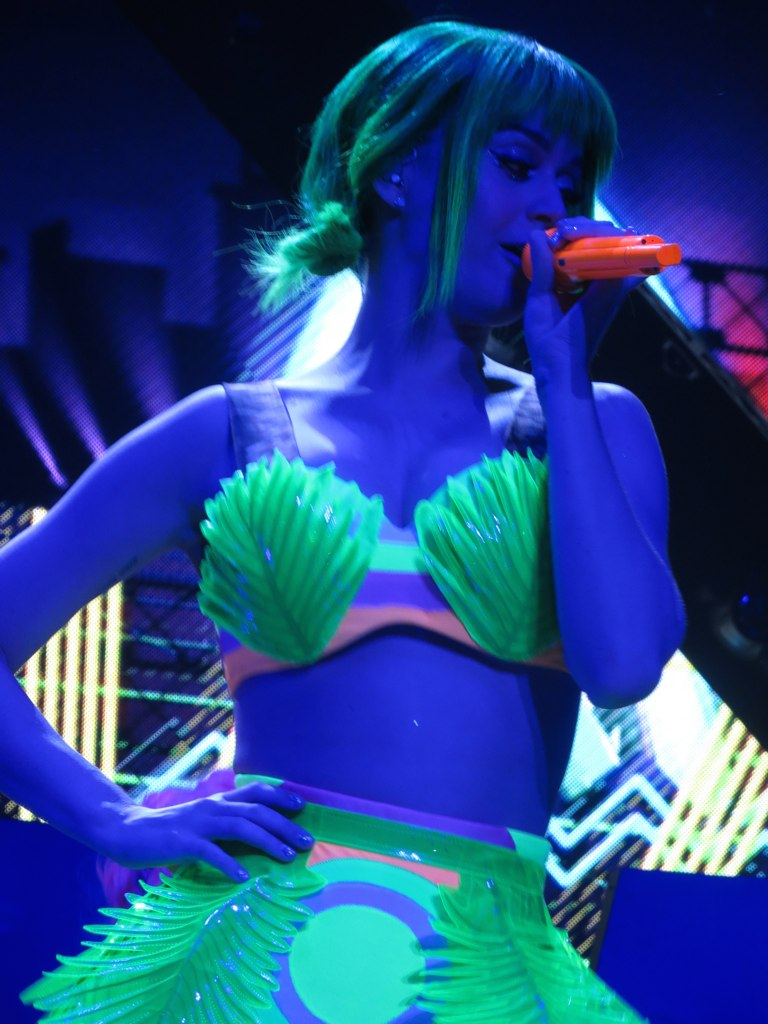
Katy Perry was one of the inspirations for the album Guilty Pleasure.

In April 2008, she said that she has recorded a few songs for the album and she would fully focus on the album after filming High School Musical 3. Tisdale has noted that the songs in the album have a message and a story that anyone can relate to, and hoped to reveal her "edgier" side with more mature songs. She also said the album was titled Guilty Pleasure because of her guilty pleasures. Tisdale was involved in every aspect of the album's production. Tisdale's music inspirations for the album include Katy Perry and Pat Benatar. The song "Switch" is also featured in the motion picture Aliens in the Attic, which Tisdale starred in.

I’ve been working on the second album for a year, and it’s something completely different from the first album. Doing the first album is a lot of learning about yourself -- I had to get to know what I like, even though I knew I wanted to do something pop and R&B. I went for more of a rock sound. I’m 23 now, so I’m growing up, and I wanted something more mature and edgier. I’m starting to show a side of myself that people don’t know.

— Ashley Tisdale

Warner Bros. said the first component of the label's album roll out was revealing Tisdale's new look with a relaunch of her web site in March and the cover of Cosmopolitan's April issue. "We wanted to create a conversation and then follow quickly with the music," he said. The album was to be released on June 16, 2009 in North America, but it was pushed back to July 28, 2009, although it was released a month before, on June 12, 2009 in several countries such as Germany, Italy and Spain. The album's release date in the US and Canada was preceded by an exclusive "Countdown to Guilty Pleasure" on iTunes for the U.S. and Canada, on which "Overrated", "What If" and "Acting Out" had promotional releases in each week. The first two songs debuted on the Billboard Bubbling Under Hot 100 Singles chart due to digital downloads at number three and number one, respectively.

== Composition ==
"It's Alright, It's OK"
"It's Alright, It's OK" is the lead single from the album

The first single, "It's Alright, It's OK", Tisdale said, "is a strong, empowering song that kind of helps you move on" and continued to say: I have definitely on and with someone you really like, if they are cheating on you, you don't want to believe it. But, unfortunately, you either stay in the relationship and keep getting hurt because it keeps happening or you get up and you move on. You don't look back. Tisdale said the song "Hot Mess" is "about hanging out with a motorcycle bad boy that makes life more interesting" and the song "How Do You Love Someone", written by Porcelain Black, is "about a girl who deals with the split of her parents". Tisdale said the song could also be about "when you have been cheated on or you're in a relationship". Black was initially reluctant to let Tisdale record the song, but eventually green-lit the track; however, she also recorded her own version, produced by RedOne. Tisdale co-wrote several songs on the album such as "What If", which was co-written with Kara DioGuardi. Tisdale described "What If" as the most personal song on the album, and said the song "is about when you’re in a relationship and you say 'If I really needed you, would you actually be there?’" "Time's Up" it was first recorded by American pop singer Katy Perry, for her second album One of the Boys (2008), though it was never included for the album and was passed on to Tisdale.

== Reception ==
=== Critical response ===
Professional ratings
Review scores
Source	Rating
About.com	3/5 stars
AllMusic	3.5/5 stars
Billboard	4.5/10 stars
Chicago Tribune	2/5 stars
Digital Spy	3/5 stars
Entertainment Weekly	C+
Los Angeles Times	1.5/4 stars
New York Times	Mixed
OK! Magazine	3/5 stars
People Magazine	2.5/4 stars

Following its release, Guilty Pleasure generated mixed reviews from critics and has a 48 out of 100 on Metacritic, based on six critical reviews. The most positive of reviews came from Allmusic's Stephen Erlewine, who gave the album three and a half stars out of five, stating that when Tisdale "sticks to the surface, she makes sure that Guilty Pleasure lives up to its title". The ballads however, were not as well received, stating Tisdale "isn't convincing when she tries to deal in either pain or carnality". Billboard gave the album a mixed review with four and a half stars out of ten, stating Tisdale "can deliver the radio-ready goods" but criticized the album as a whole and that it "doesn't give the singer room to comfortably let loose". Digital Spy's Nick Levine praised Guilty Pleasure for Tisdale's new sound, comparing her to the likes of Kelly Clarkson and Ashlee Simpson. Levine praised tracks such as "It's Alright, It's OK", "Erase and Rewind" and "Hot Mess", however was not impressed with "Crank It Up", stating it "shamelessly rips off Britney's robopop sound, right down to the Spears-aping vocals"; he went on to give the album three out of five stars. The most negative of reviews came from Margaret Wappler of the Los Angeles Times who only gave the album one and a half out of four stars. Wappler said the album has "few glimmers of hope" and went on to criticize the producers as "not seem[ing] to have gifted Tisdale with their best work".

=== Chart performance ===
The album debuted on several European charts, the first appearances of the album were in the last week of June 2009, on Austrian Albums Chart and German Albums Chart, peaking at number seven and nine respectively, in the same week the album debuted at number 51 on Irish Albums Chart and rose to number 30 in the following week while in Spain, the album debuted at number 21 and rose to number nine in the second week. In the first week in August 2009, the album debuted at number 12 on the Billboard 200 selling 25,000 copies in its first week. The album dropped out of the Billboard 200 after eight weeks on the chart. The album had sold 245,000 copies in the United States as of December 9, 2010.

== Promotion ==
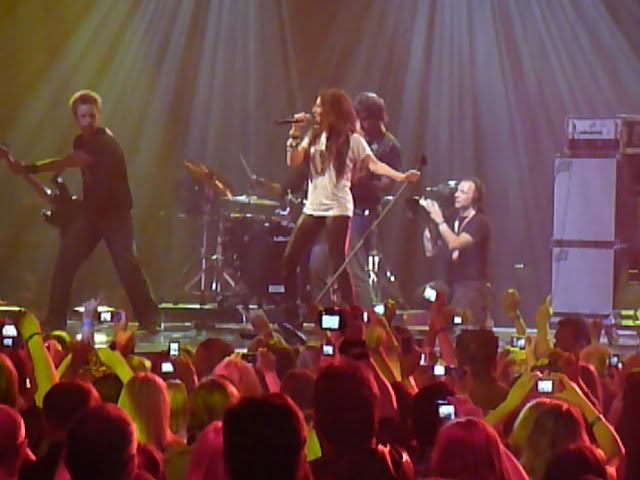
Tisdale performing "It's Alright, It's OK" at Comet Awards in Germany.

Tisdale embarked on a press European promo tour in March 2009, where she visited the United Kingdom, France, Germany, and Italy. Tisdale started a promo radio tour in May 2009 for United States. On April 14, 2009, she was presenting the lead single of the album on On Air with Ryan Seacrest, one month later she performed for first time a few songs from the album at the 2009 KISS Concert on May 17, 2009. The music video of "It's Alright, It's OK" was shown in 6,600 movie theatres in the United States. In early June 2009, she started her second promotional tour for Europe, visiting Germany, Italy and Spain, here performed on several television shows, such as German Wetten, dass..? and Comet Awards, Spanish Fama and Operación Triunfo, and Italian TRL. Her first performance in the American television was on June 16, 2009, performing the first single and "Masquerade" on Good Morning America, later Tisdale and her band promoted the album on several American television shows including Today Show and America's Got Talent. Tisdale along with her band performed several free concerts across the United States, including the opening for the first Microsoft Store on Scottsdale, Arizona, on October 22, 2009. Later in the month she performed "It's Alright, It's OK" at the MTV Latin Video Music Awards held in Mexico. She also performed songs from Guilty Pleasure and recorded live performances for AOL Sessions and Walmart Soundcheck, the last being released as a digital Extended Play on August 4, 2009.

=== Singles ===
"It's Alright, It's OK" was released as the album's lead single on April 13, 2009, in Canada, and in the United States on the next day, in both radio airplay and digital download formats. The single debuted at #99 on the Billboard Hot 100 in the same week, making it Tisdale's lowest-charting official single on the chart. The song's highest peak position was #5 on the Austrian Singles Chart.

"Crank It Up" was released on October 9, 2009, as the album's second and final international single. The music video premiered on October 5, 2009, via VIVA and was featured on MySpace on October 6, 2009.

=== Promotional singles ===
"Masquerade", "Overrated", "Acting Out" and "What If" were released as part of the Guilty Pleasure countdown on iTunes. “What If” and “Overrated” debuted at numbers 1 and 3 on the Bubbling Under Hot 100 Singles, respectively.

== Track listing ==
Guilty Pleasure track listing
No.	Title	Writer(s)	Producer(s)	Length
1.	"Acting Out"	Ashley Tisdale; Niclas Molinder; Joacim Persson; Steve McMorran; Johan Alkenäs; David Jassy	Alke	3:46
2.	"It's Alright, It's OK"	Molinder; Persson; Alkenäs; Jassy	Twin; Alke; Kelly Levesque^{[a]}	2:59
3.	"Masquerade"	Leah Haywood; Daniel James; Shelly Peiken	Dreamlab	2:56
4.	"Overrated"	Tisdale; Molinder; Persson; Alkenäs; Charlie Mason	Twin; Kapari	3:40
5.	"Hot Mess"	Warren "Oak" Felder; Heather Bright	Oak; Bright^{[a]}	3:26
6.	"How Do You Love Someone"	Billy Steinberg; Josh Alexander; Alaina Beaton	Alexander; Steinberg; Chris Garcia^{[a]}	3:28
7.	"Tell Me Lies"	J. Cates; Emanuel Kiriakou; Frankie Storm	Kiriakou	3:38
8.	"What If"	Tisdale; Kara DioGuardi; Molinder; Persson; Alkenäs	Twin; Alke	4:23
9.	"Erase and Rewind"	Molinder; Persson; Johan Fransson; Tim Larsson; Tobias Lundgren	Twin; Play	3:25
10.	"Hair"	Warren "Oak" Felder; Andrew "Pop" Wansel; Chasity Nwagbara	Oak; Pop	3:10
11.	"Delete You"	Diane Warren	Toby Gad	3:34
12.	"Me Without You"	Tisdale; Lindy Robbins; Gad	Gad	4:09
13.	"Crank It Up" (bonus track)	Molinder; Persson; Alkenäs; Jassy	Twin; Alke	3:01
14.	"Switch" (from the motion picture Aliens in the Attic; bonus track)	Kate Akhurst; Vince Pizzinga	Deekay	3:39
Total length:				49:09

Limited edition bonus tracks
No.	Title	Writer(s)	Producer(s)	Length
15.	"I'm Back"	Lars Halvor Jensen; Johannes Joergensen; Dicky Klein	Deekay	3:31
16.	"Whatcha Waiting For"	Tisdale; Molinder; Persson; Alkenäs; Jassy	Twin, Alke	3:10
Total length:				55:49

Japanese edition bonus tracks
No.	Title	Writer(s)	Producer(s)	Length
15.	"Guilty Pleasure"	Lauren Christy; Graham Edwards; Scott Spock; Jadyn Maria	The Matrix	3:16
16.	"It's Alright, It's OK" (music video)	Molinder; Persson; Alkenäs; Jassy	Twin; Alke; Kelly Levesque^{[a]}	3:15
Total length:				55:40

iTunes Store and Latin American digital deluxe edition bonus tracks
No.	Title	Writer(s)	Producer(s)	Length
15.	"It's Alright, It's OK" (Jason Nevins Radio Remix)	Molinder; Persson; Alkenäs; Jassy	Twin; Alke; Levesque^{[a]}; Jason Nevins^{[b]}	3:13
16.	"Time's Up"	Lauren Christy; Graham Edwards; Scott Spock	The Matrix	3:25
17.	"Blame It on the Beat"	Anders Bagge; Peer Åström; Nicole Hassman	Bagge & Peer	3:28
Total length:				59:15

US Target and German Müller edition bonus DVD
No.	Title	Length
1.	"Exclusive Behind-the-Scenes Footage of Ashley's Photo Shoot"
2.	"Behind-the-Scenes Band Audition"
3.	"Making of New Album"
4.	"It's Alright, It's OK" (music video)

Notes

- ^{^a} signifies a vocal producer
- ^{^b} signifies a remixer

== Charts ==
Chart (2009)	Peak position
Austrian Albums (Ö3 Austria)	7
Canadian Albums (Billboard)	15
European Top 100 Albums (Billboard)	21
German Albums (Offizielle Top 100)	9
Irish Albums (IRMA)	30
Italian Albums (FIMI)	51
Japanese Albums (Oricon)	87
Mexican Albums (Top 100 Mexico)	59
New Zealand Albums (RMNZ)	27
Spanish Albums (Promusicae)	9
Swiss Albums (Schweizer Hitparade)	13
UK Albums (OCC)	130
US Billboard 200	12

== Release history ==
Country	Date	Label	Format(s)
Spain	June 11, 2009	Warner Music	CD
Germany	June 12, 2009	Warner Music	CD/CD+DVD
Italy	June 12, 2009	Warner Music	CD
Brazil	June 12, 2009	Warner Music	CD
Slovakia	June 12, 2009	Warner Music	CD
Israel	June 12, 2009	Warner Music	CD
Netherlands	June 15, 2009	Warner Music	CD
United Kingdom	June 15, 2009	Warner Music	CD
Denmark	June 15, 2009	Warner Music	CD
France	June 15, 2009	Warner Music	CD
Hong Kong	June 16, 2009	Warner Music	CD
Poland	June 22, 2009	Warner Music	CD
Chile	June 30, 2009	Warner Music	CD
Taiwan	June 30, 2009	Warner Music	CD
New Zealand	July 6, 2009	Warner Music	CD
Japan	July 8, 2009	Warner Music	CD
Canada	July 28, 2009	Warner Music	CD; CD+DVD; Limited edition
United States	July 28, 2009	Warner Music	CD; CD+DVD; Limited edition
Mexico	August 11, 2009	Warner Music	CD
Australia	January 18, 2010	Warner Music	Digital download
United States	November 3, 2024	Warner Music	Vinyl
