= List of songs recorded by No Angels =

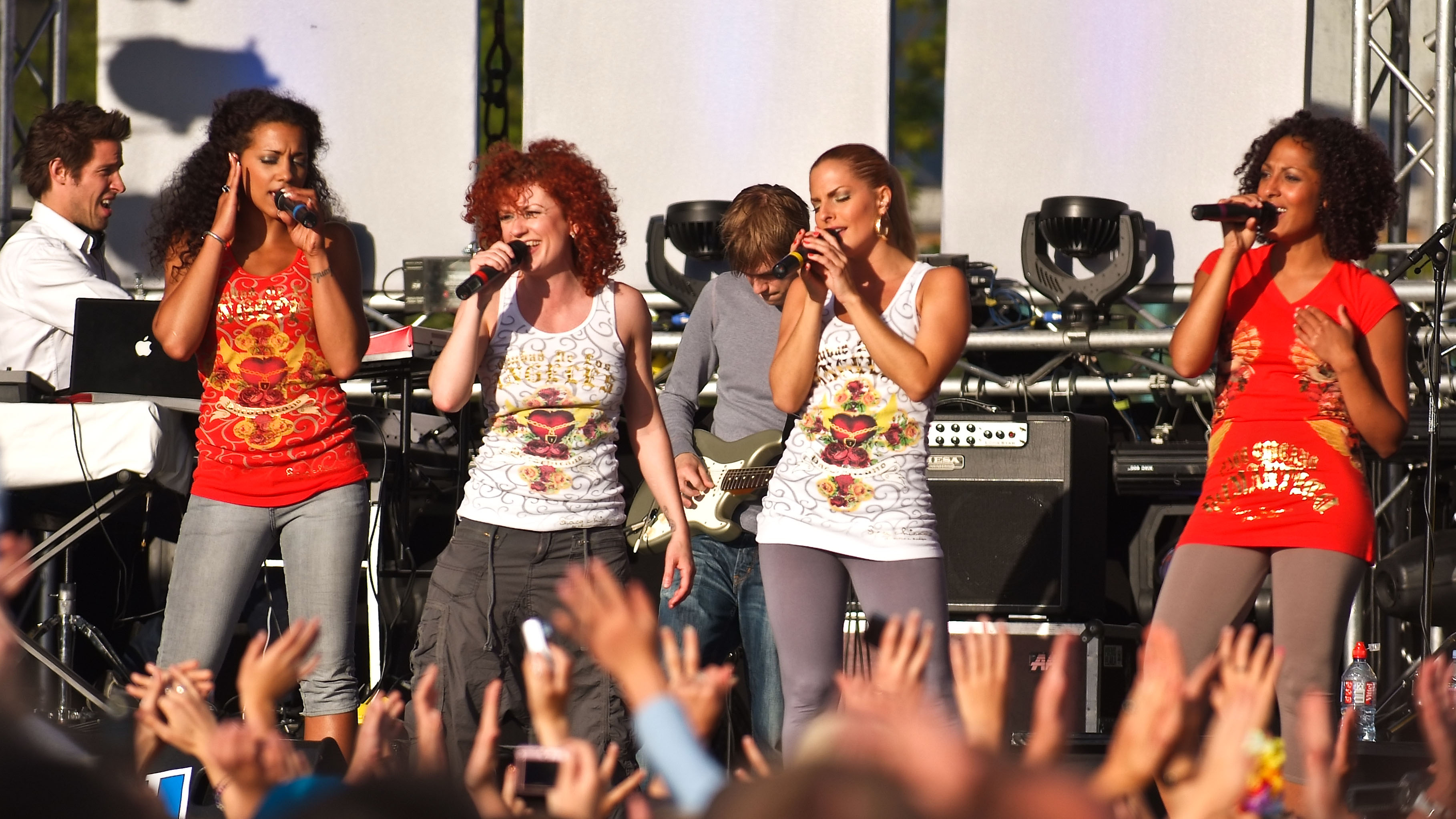
Left to right: Nadja Benaissa, Lucy Diakovska, Sandy Mölling and Jessica Wahls on-stage at the Kieler Woche on 27 June 2008.

German-based No Angels, one of the most successful acts in German music history, are an all-female pop band formed in 2000 on the debut season of the German adaption of the talent series Popstars. Originally a quintet, consisting of band members Nadja Benaissa, Lucy Diakovska, Sandy Mölling, Vanessa Petruo, and Jessica Wahls, they were one of the first television-cast acts to achieve continued success throughout Central Europe in the early 2000s. No Angels made their debut with Elle'ments (2001). Cheyenne Records consulted a small team of German-based musicians to work with the quintet on the album, including Thorsten Brötzmann, Peter Ries, Leslie Mándoki, and Peter Plate. Most of them would become frequent collaborators on subsequent projects Now... Us! (2002) and Pure (2003). Beginning with their second album Now... Us!, the band took a wider role in contributing own lyrics and melodies to their music, with Petruo co-writing the number-one single "Something About Us". At the same time, the group sourced songs from a growing number of international songwriters, particularly from Australia, Scandinavia, and the United Kingdom.

== Released songs ==
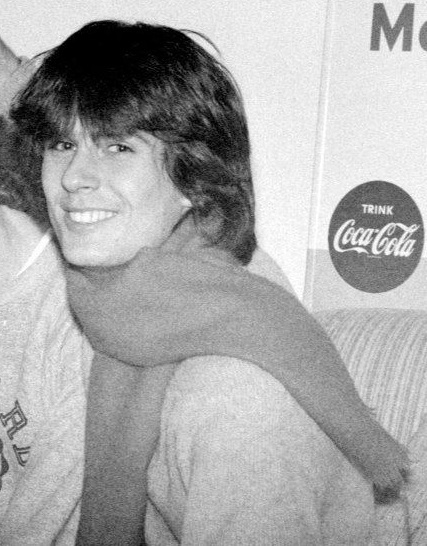
Peter Ries (pictured) produced several tracks on the band's first three albums.

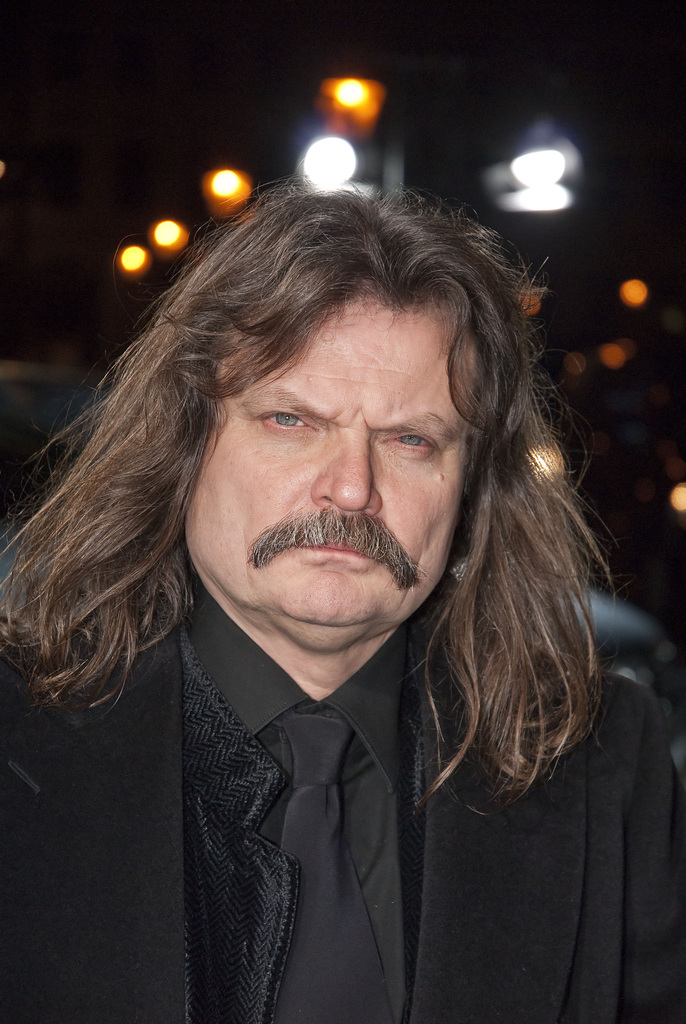
Leslie Mándoki (pictured) was a major contributor on Elle'ments (2001) and Now... Us! (2002).

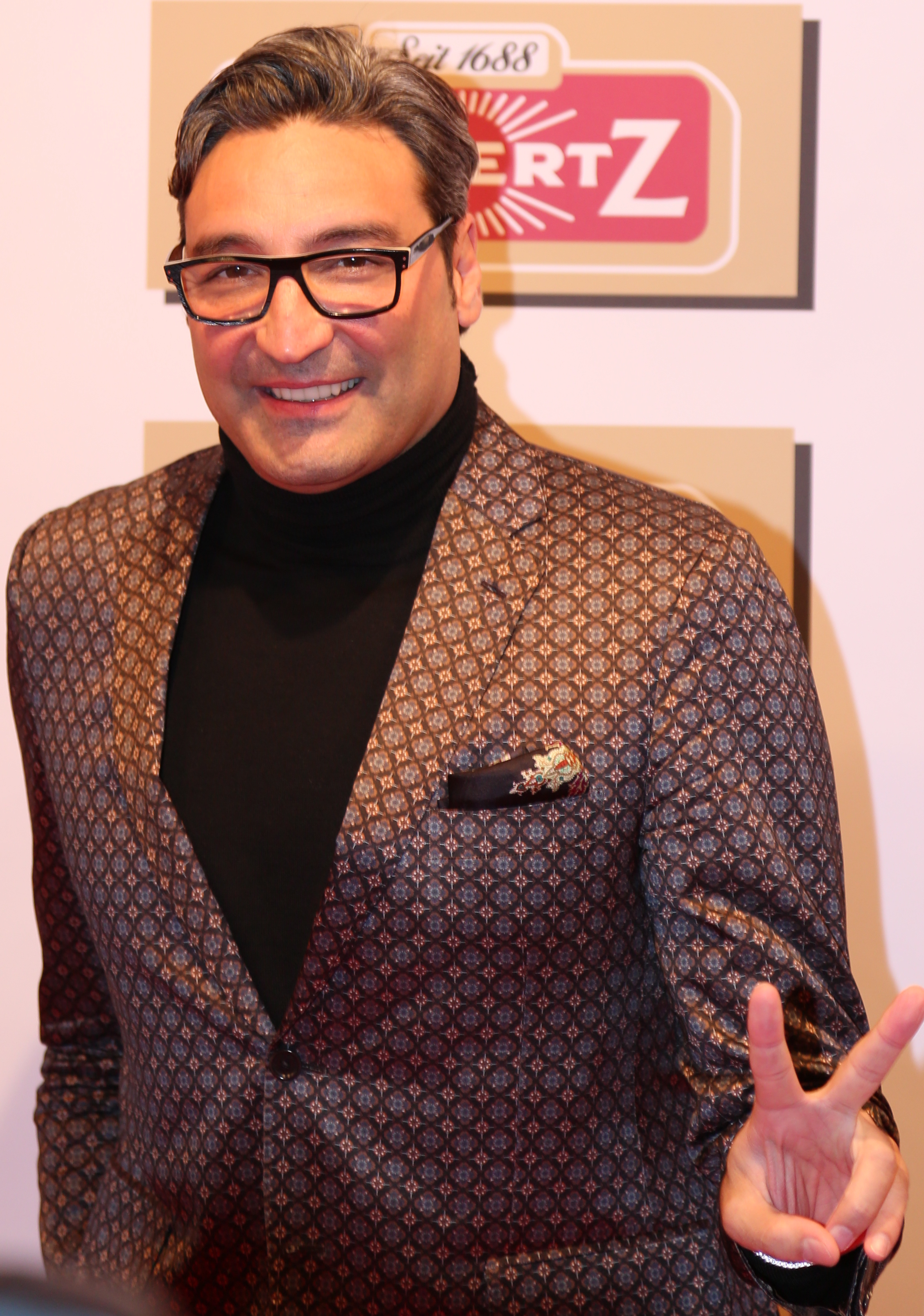
Mousse T. (pictured) wrote and produced both the album version and the single remix of "Let's Go to Bed (2002).

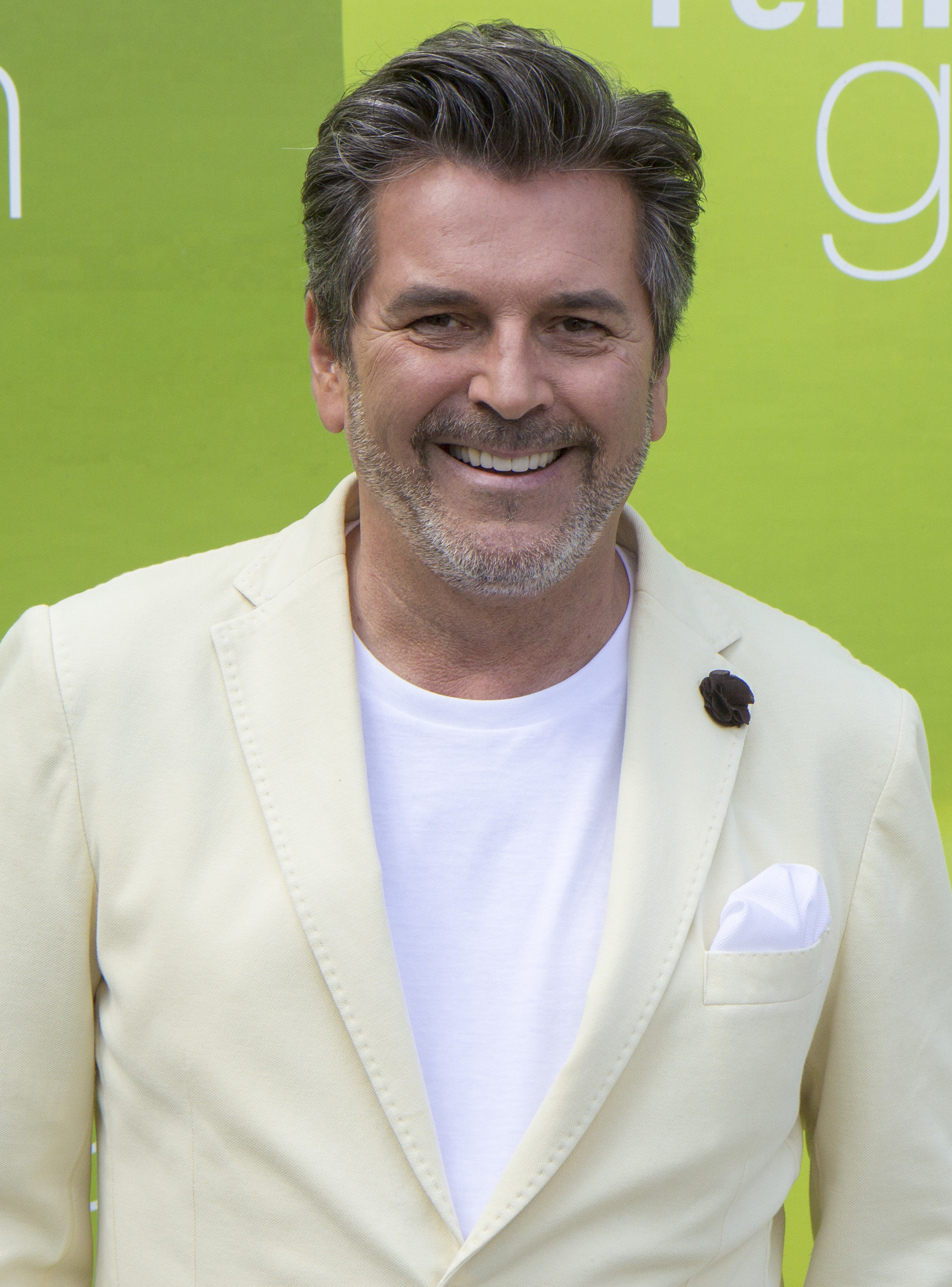
Singer Thomas Anders (pictured) penned several tracks for Elle'ments (2001) and When the Angels Swing (2002).

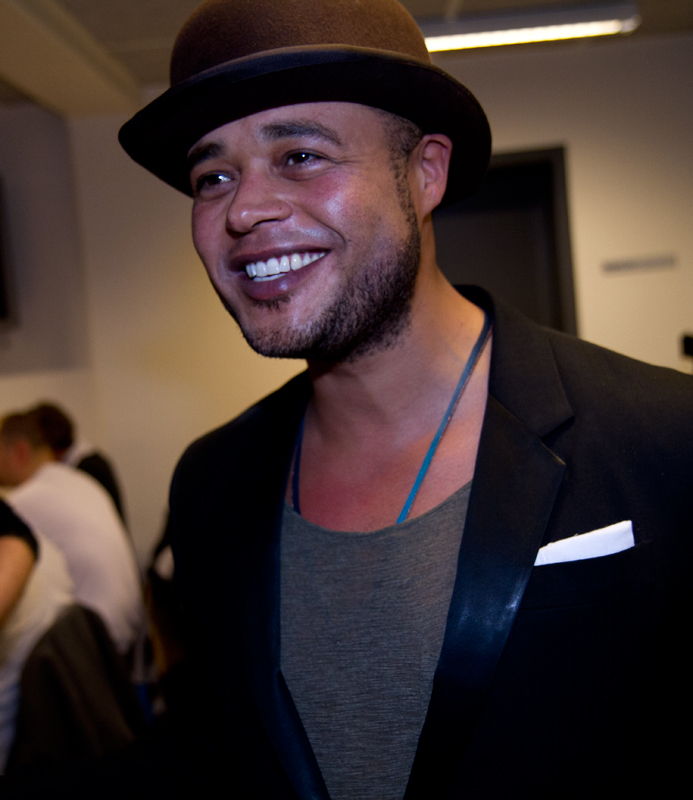
Remee (pictured) produced No Angels' ESC entry "Disappear" (2008).

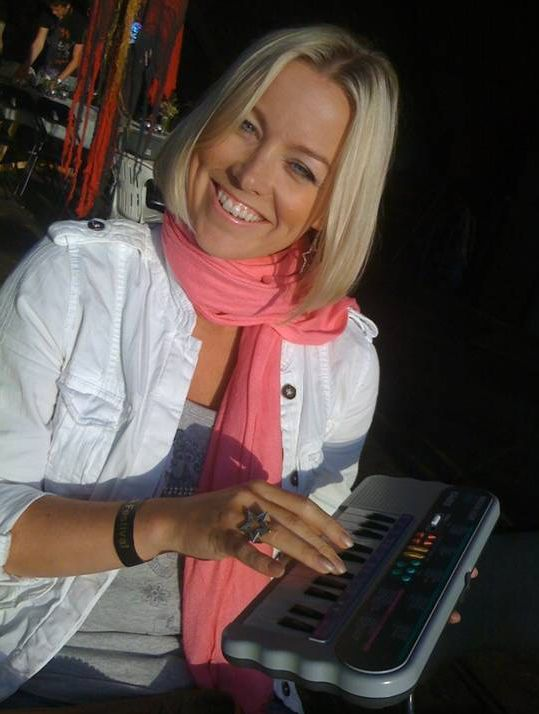
Singer Hanne Sørvaag (pictured) wrote the band's ESC entry "Disappear" as well as "The Rhythm of My Heart."

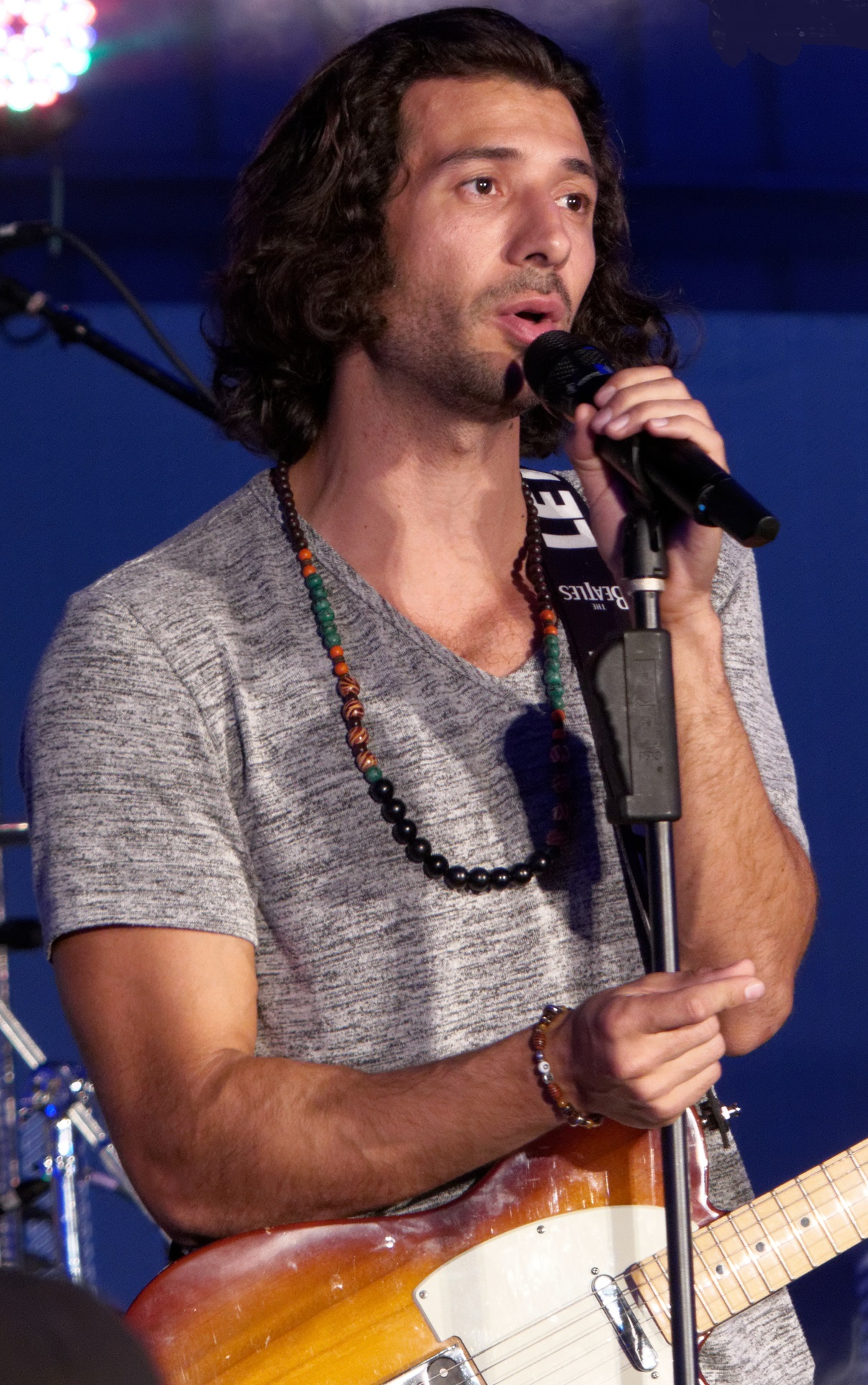
Nasri Atweh (pictured) co-wrote, produced and was featured on several tracks on Welcome to the Dance (2009) and 20 (2021).

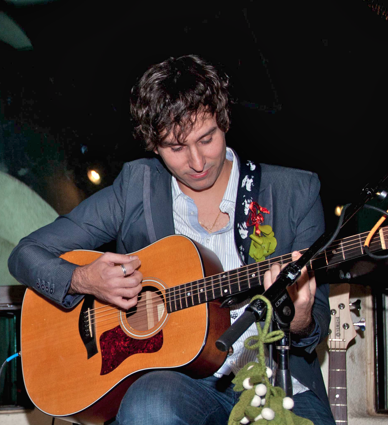
Adam Messinger (pictured) co-wrote and produced four tracks on Welcome to the Dance (2009), including "One Life."

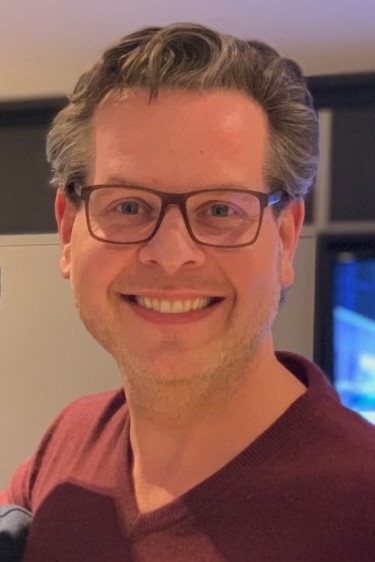
Christian Geller (pictured) was chief producer on 20 (2021) and It's Christmas (2025).

Song	Writer(s)	Originating album	Year	Ref.
"100% Emotional"	Johan Aberg; Paul Rein; Winston Sela	Elle'ments	2001	
"2 Get Over You"	Tim Brettschneider; Alan Glass; Sandi Schumann	Now... Us!	2002	
"A New Day"	Nasri Atweh	20	2021	
"A Reason"	Derek Bramble; Dana Glover; Lindy Robbins	Destiny	2007	
"Ain't Gonna Look the Other Way"	Tracy Ackerman; Peer Astrom; Anders Bagge	Destiny	2007	
"All Cried Out"	Steve Jolley; Alison Moyet; Tony Swain	Now... Us! / When the Angels Swing	2002	
"Amaze Me"	Steve Mac; Karen Poole	Destiny	2007	
"Anchor Your Love"	Oliver Dommaschk; Kaidy-Ann Morgan; Marco Quast	Now... Us!	2002	
"Angel of Mine"	Stephan Browarczyk; Christoph Brüx; Alexandra Prince; Mirko von Schlieffen	Pure	2003	
"Atlantis" (with Donovan)	Donovan Leitch	Now... Us!	2002	
"Autumn Breeze"	D. Dowlut	Now... Us!	2002	
"Back Off"	Pelle Ankarberg; David Jassy; Niclas Molinder; Joacim Persson	Destiny	2007	
"Be My Man (The Plan)"	Laszlo Bencker; Leslie Mándoki	Elle'ments	2001	
"Been Here Before"	Mia Bergström; Haakan Nils Ingvar Glante; Tobias Gustafsson	Destiny	2007	
"Cold as Ice"	David Brunner; Christopher Cousins; Marc Klammer	Elle'ments	2001	
"Come Back"	Cal Abate; Nadja Benaissa; Daniel Troha	Now... Us!	2002	
"Confession"	Lucy Diakovska	Pure	2003	
"Couldn't Care Less"	Franciz & LePont	Elle'ments	2001	
"Cry for You"	Thomas Anders; Christian Geller	Elle'ments	2001	
"Dance-Aholic"	Nasri Atweh; Aaron Pearce	Welcome to the Dance	2009	
"Daylight in Your Eyes"	Tony Bruno; Tommy Byrnes	Elle'ments	2001	
"Derailed"	Nasri Atweh; Bill Blast; Nicolas Furlong; Aaron Pearce	Welcome to the Dance	2009	
"Disappear"	Remee; Hanne Sørvaag; Thomas Troelsen	Destiny	2007	
"Do They Know It's Christmas?" (with TV-Allstars)	Bob Geldof; Midge Ure	The Ultimate Christmas Album	2003	
"Don't Hesitate"	—N/a	Magix Video Maker	2001	
"Down Boy"	Tiyon Mack; Le'che Martin; Chad Roper; Aaron Pearce	Welcome to the Dance	2009	
"Eleven Out of Ten"	Pelle Ankarberg; Charlie Dore; Niclas Molinder; Joacim Persson	Pure	2003	
"Faith Can Move a Mountain"	Julian Feifel	Elle'ments	2001	
"Feelgood Lies"	Pelle Ankarberg; Charlie Dore; Niclas Molinder; Maryann Morgan; Joacim Persson	Pure	2003	
"Forever Yours"	Fredrik Thomander; Anders Wikström	Pure	2003	
"Funky Dance"	Thomas Anders; Christian Geller; Lucy Diakovska	When the Angels Swing	2002	
"Goodbye to Yesterday"	Pelle Ankarberg; Charlie Dore; Niclas Molinder; Joacim Persson	Destiny	2007	
"Grown-Up Christmas List"	David Foster; Linda Thompson-Jenner	It's Christmas	2025	
"Have Yourself a Merry Little Christmas"	Ralph Blane; Hugh Martin	It's Christmas	2025	
"How Can We Be Friends"	Dane Deviller; Sean Hosein; Pam Sheyne	Pure	2003	
"I Believe in You"	Johan Ekhé; Negin Djafari; Ulf Lindström	Destiny	2007	
"I Don't Wanna Talk About It"	David Clewett; Negin Djafari; Ivar Lisinski	Destiny	2007	
"I Had a Feeling"	Arnthor Birgisson; Jörgen Elofsson	Destiny	2007	
"I Still Believe"	Christoph Aßmann; Christian Geller	It's Christmas	2025	
"In My Head"	Henrik Nielsen	Pure	2003	
"It's Christmas"	Nasri Atweh; Adam Messinger; George Nozuka; Jordan Orvosh	It's Christmas	2025	
"It's the Most Wonderful Time of the Year"	Edward Pola; George Wyle	It's Christmas	2025	
"Let Me Be the One"	—N/a	Magix Video Maker	2001	
"Let It Snow! Let It Snow! Let It Snow!"	Sammy Cahn; Jule Styne	It's Christmas	2025	
"Let's Go to Bed" (with Mousse T.)	Errol Rennalls; Mousse T.	Now... Us!	2002	
"Life Is a Miracle"	Michelle Leonard; Frank Kurt Meyer; Dieter Müller-Christ; Claudio Pagonis	Kleiner Dodo soundtrack	2008	
"Like Ice in the Sunshine"	Holger Julian Copp; Hanno Harders	Now... Us!	2002	
"Lost in You"	Tim Brettschneider; Alan Glass; Sandi Schumann	Now... Us!	2002	
"Love You for Eternity"	Christoph Aßmann; Nasri Atweh; Christian Geller; Sandy Mölling	20	2021	
"Lovestory"	Par Åström; Anders Bagge; Reed Vertenley	Now... Us!	2002	
"Mad Wild"	Flo August; Sophie Alexandra Tweed-Sunnibs; Andrew Tyler; Ásdís María Viðarsdóttir	20	2021	
"Make a Change"	Peter Ibsen; Christina Rumbley; Sacha Skarbek	Destiny	2007	
"Mary's Little Baby"	Nadja Benaissa; Jerry Divmond; Noël André Lunguana	It's Christmas	2025	
"Maybe"	Pelle Ankarberg; Niclas Molinder; Maryann Morgan; Joacim Persson	Destiny	2007	
"Minute by Minute" (featuring Nasri)	Arnthor Birgisson; Savan Kotecha	Welcome to the Dance	2009	
"Misguided Heart"	Hannah Robinson; Steve Robson	Destiny	2007	
"New Beginning"	Negin Djafari; Thomas Who	Pure	2003	
"Nitelife"	—N/a	Magix Video Maker	2001	
"No Angel (It's All in Your Mind)"	Tim Hawes; Pete Kirtley; Liz Winstanley	Pure	2003	
"Now That We Found Love"	Thorsten Brötzmann; Ulrich Wehner	Now... Us!	2002	
"Oh, Holy Night"	Adolphe Adam; John Sullivan Dwight	It's Christmas	2025	
"One Life"	Nasri Atweh; Hakim Bell; Nadja Benaissa; Lucy Diakovska; Akene Dunkley; Adam Messinger; Sandy Mölling; Jessica Wahls	Welcome to the Dance	2009	
"Perfect Kind of Us"	Christoph Aßmann; Christian Geller	Der perfekte Urlaub soundtrack	2026	
"Promises Can Wait"	Dawn Faith Schönherz; Peter Ries	Elle'ments	2001	
"Push Me to the Limit"	Laszlo Bencker; Leslie Mándoki	Now... Us!	2002	
"Reason"	Thorsten Brötzmann; Alexander Geringas	The Best of No Angels	2003	
"Rebel"	Bill Blast; Alisha Brooks	Welcome to the Dance	2009	
"Rivers of Joy"	Hans Andersson; Niklas Pettersson	Elle'ments	2001	
"Santa Baby"	Joan Javits; Philip Springer; Tony Springer	It's Christmas	2025	
"Santa Claus Is Comin' to Town"	Haven Gillespie; J. Fred Coots	It's Christmas	2025	
"Say Goodbye"	Velroy Baily; Celetia Martin; Sandy Mölling; Ian Pitter	Now... Us!	2002	
"Say Goodbye"	Nasri Atweh; Adam Messinger	Welcome to the Dance	2009	
"Secret's Out"	Mats Berntoft; Celetia Martin; Magnus Wallbert	Destiny	2007	
"Send Me Flowers"	Axel Breitung	Elle'ments	2001	
"Shield Against My Sorrow"	Laszlo Bencker; Leslie Mándoki; Nik Hafemann; Jessica Wahls	Now... Us!	2002	
"Shut Your Mouth"	Evan "Kidd" Bogart; Nadja Benaissa; Lucy Diakovska; David Quiñones; Aaron Pearce	Welcome to the Dance	2009	
"Silent Night"	Franz Xaver Gruber; Joseph Mohr	It's Christmas	2025	
"Sister"	Thorsten Brötzmann; Alexander Geringas; Vanessa Petruo	Pure	2003	
"So Wanna Be with You"	Ferdinand Bolland; Peter Ries	The History of Popstars	2004	
"So What"	Denise Adam; Jane Dobbins; Tim Hawes; Pete Kirtley	Pure	2003	
"Soft Place to Fall"	Allan Simpson	Pure	2003	
"Someday"	Niklas Hillbom; Thomas Jansson	Pure	2003	
"Someday at Christmas"	Ron Miller; Bryan Wells	It's Christmas	2025	
"Something About Us"	Thorsten Brötzmann; Alexander Geringas; Vanessa Petruo	Now... Us!	2002	
"Still in Love with You"	Figge Boström; Johan Lindman	Now... Us!	2002	
"Stop"	Bill Blast; Alisha Brooks	Welcome to the Dance	2009	
"Takes a Woman to Know"	Charlie Dore; Terry Britten	Pure	2003	
"Teardrops"	Cecil Womack; Linda Womack	Destiny Reloaded	2008	
"Ten Degrees"	Thorsten Brötzmann; Alexander Geringas; Vanessa Petruo	Pure	2003	
"That's the Reason"	Thorsten Brötzmann; Alexander Geringas	Elle'ments	2002	
"The Christmas Song"	Robert Wells; Mel Tormé	It's Christmas	2025	
"The Rhythm of My Heart"	Alexah Carlton; Andreas John; Erik McHoll; Mario Novack; Hanne Sørvaag; Adrian Zag	Destiny	2007	
"There Must Be an Angel"	Annie Lennox; David A. Stewart	Elle'ments	2002	
"This Christmas"	Donny Hathaway; Nadine McKinnor	It's Christmas	2025	
"Three Words"	Josef Larossi; Andreas Romdhane	Now... Us!	2002	
"Thunderstorm"	Arnthor Birgisson; Bill Blast; Lucy Diakovska; Savan Kotecha; Peter Patzer	Welcome to the Dance	2009	
"Too Old"	Nasri Atweh; Lucy Diakovska; Adam Messinger	Welcome to the Dance	2009	
"Up Against the Wall"	Evan "Kidd" Bogart; Sandy Mölling; David Quiñones; Aaron Pearce; Jessica Wahls	Welcome to the Dance	2009	
"Venus"	Robbie van Leeuwen	Pure	2003	
"Washes Over Me"	Arlene Gold; Brian Nash; Mike Post	Pure	2003	
"We Keep the Spirit Alive"	Christoph Aßmann; Christian Geller; Sandy Mölling	20	2021	
"Welcome to the Dance"	Bill Blast; Alisha Brooks	Welcome to the Dance	2009	
"What Am I Supposed to Do"	Rob Hardt; Senait Mehari; Harry Zier	Elle'ments	2002	
"What If"	Adrian Newman	Destiny	2007	
"Where Is Your Love" (DJ Bobo featuring No Angels)	Axel Breitung; René Baumann	Celebration	2002	
"Wherever You Go"	—N/a	Magix Video Maker	2001	
"When the Angels Sing"	Peter Ries; Charlemaine Thomas-Schmidtmer	Elle'ments	2001	
"You Could Be the First"	Ralf Lübke	Elle'ments	2001	
"You Lied"	Sandy Frederickson; Kit Hain; Suzanne Smith	Pure	2003	
"Young Love"	Nasri Atweh; Adam Messinger; Sandy Mölling; Jessica Wahls	Welcome to the Dance	2009	

== Live songs ==
- "Baby Can I Hold You" – Rivers of Joy Tour, 2001
- "Fernando" – Die ultimative Chart Show, 2003
- "Genio Atrapado" – Rivers of Joy Tour, 2001
- "If Your Girl Only Knew"/"Try Again" (Aaliyah Medley) – Rivers of Joy Tour, 2001
- "River Deep - Mountain High" – Rivers of Joy Tour, 2001
- "You Are Everything" – Rivers of Joy Tour, 2001

== Unreleased songs ==
These songs were recorded by No Angels but remain unreleased:

Song	Artist(s)	Writer(s)	Ref.
"2 Get Over U"	No Angels & Hear'Say	Sandi Strmljan; Tim Brettschneider; Alan Glass	
"Boy It's You"	No Angels	Hermann Hinrich Behrens; Terri Bjerre; Piero Brunetti; Ambrogio Crotti	
"Chemicals React"	No Angels	Timothy Hawes; Obi Mhondera; Will Simms	
"Copy And Paste"	No Angels	Jens Gad; LaMenga Kafi; Erik Lewander	
"Even If I Try"	No Angels	Thomas Anders; Lucy Diakovska; Christian Geller	
"Falling Up, Standing Down"	No Angels	Hiten Bharadia; Iain Farquharson; Blair MacKichan	
"I Want to Be There"	No Angels	Alexander Geringas; Alan Glass; Emma Owens	
"Latino Mi Amor"	No Angels	Unknown	
"Since I Found You"	No Angels	Thorsten Brötzmann; Alexander Geringas; Vanessa Petruo	
"Tears That I Cry"	No Angels	Thomas Anders; Lucy Diakovska; Christian Geller	
"Under Your Sun"	No Angels	Martin Briley; Dana Calitry; Jeffrey Franzel	
"When I Found Love"	No Angels	Thomas Anders; Lucy Diakovska; Christian Geller	

== See also ==
- No Angels discography
