= Very Best of No Angels =

Compilation album by No Angels
- Released: 27 May 2008
- Recorded: 2001–2007
- Genre: Pop, dance-pop
- Label: Polydor, Universal
- Producer: Pelle Ankarberg, Boogieman, Thorsten Brötzmann, Nik Hafemann, Jeo, Thomas Lundgren, Patrik Majer, Leslie Mandoki, Mousse T, Nick Nice, Peter Plate, Ulf Leo Sommer, Peter Ries, Perky Park, Pontus Söderqvist, Roland Spremberg, Remee, Thomas Troelsen, Twin

No Angels chronology
Destiny (2007)	Very Best of No Angels (2008)	Welcome to the Dance (2009)

Very Best of No Angels is a compilation album by German pop group No Angels. It was released by Polydor Records and Universal Music on 27 May 2008 in most European territories (excluding Austria, Germany, and Switzerland), following the group's participation in the Eurovision Song Contest 2008 in Belgrade, Serbia.

== Track listing ==
No.	Title	Writer(s)	Producer(s)	Length
1.	"Disappear"	Remee; Hanne Sørvaag; Thomas Troelsen	Remee; Thomas Troelsen	3:19
2.	"Been Here Before"	Mia Bergström; Tobias Gustafsson; Haakan Nils Ingvar Glante	Tobias Gustafsson; Michel Zitron; Vincent Pontare	3:04
3.	"Amaze Me"	Steve Mac; Karen Poole	Roland Spremberg; Boogieman	3:47
4.	"Goodbye to Yesterday"	Niclas Molinder; Joacim Persson; Pelle Ankarberg; David Jassy	Twin	3:29
5.	"A Reason"	Derek Bramble; Lindy Robbins; Dana Glover	Twin; GrooveFactory	4:13
6.	"Still in Love with You"	Figge Boström; Johan Lindman	Nick Nice; Pontus Söderqvist	3:31
7.	"Back Off"	Molinder; Persson; Ankarberg; Jassy	Twin; Ankarberg^{[a]}	4:25
8.	"Eleven Out of Ten"	Molinder; Persson; Ankarberg; Charlie Dore	Thomas Lundgren	3:37
9.	"All Cried Out" (Pop Version)	Steve Jolley; Alison Moyet; Tony Swain	Perky Park	3:38
10.	"Feelgood Lies"	Molinder; Persson; Ankarberg; Dore; Maryann Morgan	Niclas Molinder; Joacim Persson	3:22
11.	"Reason"	Thorsten Brötzmann; Alexander Geringas	Thorsten Brötzmann	3:15
12.	"Let's Go to Bed" (with Mousse T.)	Mustafa Gündoğdu; Errol Rennalls	Mousse T.	3:32
13.	"No Angel (It's All in Your Mind)"	Pete Kirtley; Tim Hawes; Liz Winstanley	Perky Park; Nik Hafemann	3:14
14.	"There Must Be an Angel"	Annie Lennox; David A. Stewart	Patrik Majer; Peter Plate; Ulf Leo Sommer	3:55
15.	"Daylight in Your Eyes"	Tony Bruno; Tommy Byrnes	Brötzmann	3:30
16.	"Rivers of Joy"	Niklas Pettersson; Hans Andersson	Peter Ries	3:28
17.	"Someday"	Thomas Jansson; Niklas Hillbom	Brötzmann	3:16
18.	"Something About Us"	Vanessa Petruo; Brötzmann; Geringas	Brötzmann	3:26
19.	"When the Angels Sing"	Peter Ries; Charlemaine Thomas-Schmidtmer	Ries	3:42

=== Best of EP ===
Track listing
No.	Title	Writer(s)	Producer(s)	Length
1.	"Disappear"	Remee; Hanne Sørvaag; Thomas Troelsen	Remee; Thomas Troelsen	3:19
2.	"Been Here Before"	Tobias Gustafsson; Mia Bergström; Haakan Nils Ingvar Glante	Tobias Gustafsson; Michel Zitron; Vincent Pontare	3:04
3.	"Amaze Me"	Steve Mac; Karen Poole	Roland Spremberg; Boogieman	3:47
4.	"Still in Love with You"	Figge Boström; Johan Lindman	Nick Nice; Pontus Söderqvist	3:31
5.	"Daylight in Your Eyes"	Tony Bruno; Tommy Byrnes	Brötzmann	3:30
