= Destiny (No Angels album) =

Studio album by No Angels
- Released: 13 April 2007
- Recorded: January–March 2007
- Length: 49:24
- Labels: Polydor; Universal
- Producer: Various: AJ Junior; Arnthor; Boogieman; Thorsten Brötzmann; Ghost; GrooveFactory; Tobias Gustavsson; Jiant; Kriss K.; Kent Larsson; Ivar Lisinski; Max Martin; Adrian Newman; Vincent Pontare; Remee; Harry Sommerdahl; Roland Spremberg; Tomasino; Thomas Troelsen; Twin; Michel Zitron

No Angels chronology
Acoustic Angels (2004)	Destiny (2007)	Very Best of No Angels (2008)

Singles from Destiny
- 1. "Goodbye to Yesterday" Released: 16 March 2007; 2. "Maybe" Released: 15 June 2007; 3. "Amaze Me"/"Teardrops" Released: 19 October 2007; 4. "Disappear" Released: 29 February 2008

Destiny is the fourth regular studio album by all-female German pop group No Angels, released by Polydor Records and Universal Music Domestic on 13 April 2007 across German-speaking Europe. Conceived as a comeback project, the album marked the group's return following a hiatus announced in fall 2003, during which the members pursued individual solo careers. Production on Destiny was led primarily by the duo Twin, with additional contributions from Jiant, Arnthor Birgisson, Michel Zitron, Vincent Pontare, Max Martin, Adrian Newman, and Thorsten Brötzmann, among others. It is also the first album recorded by the group's third lineup, following original member Vanessa Petruo's decision not to return to the band.

Recorded over a comparatively brief period at Sound Studio N in Cologne, Destiny comprises a mixture of uptempo tracks and ballads that continue the stylistic direction established on the group's earlier albums, Now... Us! (2002) and Pure (2003). Musically, the album is rooted in pop, incorporating elements of pop rock alongside contemporary R&B and dance influences. Its lyrics explore themes such as friendship, committed relationships, and emotional challenges within romantic partnerships. Upon release, Destiny received generally mixed to negative reviews from critics, who frequently commended the group's vocal performances but criticized the material as formulaic and reliant on familiar pop conventions.

Commercially, Destiny failed to replicate the substantial success of the group's earlier releases. It became their first album not to reach the top position on the German Albums Chart, peaking instead at number four. It also attained positions of number 14 in Austria and number 22 in Switzerland, with sales totaling fewer than 30,000 copies in its first three months. The album produced five singles, including "Goodbye to Yesterday" and "Maybe", the ballad "Amaze Me", a cover of "Teardrops" and "Disappear," the group's entry for the Eurovision Song Contest 2008. The latter two tracks, previously unreleased in their original form, were included on a reissue titled Destiny Reloaded, released on 14 March 2008.

== Background ==
In September 2003, shortly after the release of their third album Pure, their first project without the involvement of original member Jessica Wahls, the remaining members of No Angels, Nadja Benaissa, Lucy Diakovska, Sandy Mölling, and Vanessa Petruo, announced their decision to cease group activities, citing sustained physical and emotional exhaustion following three years of intensive touring, recording, and promotional commitments. After the release of the compilation album The Best of No Angels (2003), the group formally disbanded, with its members subsequently pursuing individual careers across music, film, theatre, and television, achieving varying degrees of commercial success. Initially framed as a hiatus expected to last at least one year, the pause soon became indefinite.

In 2006, after revisiting live recordings from the group’s first two concert tours, Diakovska initiated discussions of a possible reunion by contacting her former bandmates individually. While Benaissa, Mölling, and Wahls responded positively to the proposal, Petruo declined to participate in further discussions regarding a permanent reunion, citing her commitments as an independent solo artist. though she later appeared in the two-part ProSieben documentary We Love No Angels (2007), where she expressed her support for the group's plans to reunite as a quartet. As Mölling was completing work on her second solo album Frame of Mind, both the formal announcement of the reunion and the recording of new material were postponed until 2007. In the interim, the four prospective members met with their former A&R, Nik Hafemann, and Holger Roost-Macias, the producer of the inaugural Popstars series in which the group had originally been formed to discuss their comeback strategy. However, owing to fundamental differences between Holger Roost-Macias's proposals and the group's vision for a reunion, the members unanimously declined further collaboration with him and, without his involvement, resolved to proceed independently while seeking to secure the rights to the No Angels name, then controlled by Cheyenne Records, an affiliate of his Tresor TV production company responsible for producing Popstars for the RTL II network.

== Conception and production ==
Following their split from Roost-Marcias and his management team, Benaissa, Diakovska, Mölling, and Wahls assumed responsibility for their own affairs. Hafemann remained closely involved in their musical activities and took on the role of executive producer for their as-yet-untitled forthcoming studio album. Around the turn of the year 2006/2007, the group signed a recording contract with the Domestic Pop division of Universal Music and met with several Scandinavian musicians in Stockholm where they were presented pre-existing songs for potential inclusion on their new projects. While each band member had written or pre-recorded demo songs for a new album, they eventually decided not to record self-written material as Benaissa, Diakovska, Mölling, and Wahls found themselves struggling to find a stylistic main thread within their own songs. Instead, the band focused on collecting and selecting adaptable songs with a "typical but contemporary No Angels sound", of which some were penned exclusively for the group by various songwriters from Sweden, England, and Australia.

Production was provided by a large group of Scandinavian producers, including Tobias Gustafsson, Michel Zitron, Ivar Lisinski, Vincent Pontare, and Arnthor Birgisson, as well as Ulf Lindström and Johan Ekhé from duo Ghost. In addition, the band reteamed with Thorsten Brötzmann and Joachim Persson and Niclas Molinder from duo Twin, all of which had contributed to earlier projects. Both Peter Ries and Leslie Mándoki, also frequent collaborators during the years 2001 to 2003, were not consulted. Recording began in January 2007 at the Sound Studio N in Cologne where the band spent ten days to record the first half of the album. All vocals were recorded simultaneously in two studios and control rooms to meet the deadline, with in-house studio engineers Nico Schütte and Tobias Eichelberg overseeing the process. Interrupted by several promotional appearances following the official announcement of their reunion the same month, recording sessions for the second half of the album took place in late February 2007.

== Music and title ==
Most songs on Destiny were contributed by Niclas Molinder and Joacim Persson from Swedish production team Twin, including the album's opening track and first single "Goodbye to Yesterday" which was an eleventh-hour addition to Destiny's recording listing. The duo's other offerings on the album include guitar-driven uptempo song "Back Off", which critics compared to Destiny's Child's 2001 song "Survivor", as well as the album's second single "Maybe", a cover version of Norwegian singer Trine Rein's Melodi Grand Prix 2007 entry that is built around an uncredited sample of The Beatles' 1969 number-one record "Come Together". Twin, along with GrooveFactory, also co-produced "A Reason", a remake of the same-titled Dana Glover which has been described as a highbrow track, comprising a complex musical mixture by the likes of Tori Amos and Amanda Marshall. Steve Mac and Karen Poole contributed to "Amaze Me", a pulasting hymn-like pop ballad, while newcomer Adrian Newman produced the spheric mid-tempo ballad "What If". Another ballad, "The Rhythm of My Heart", saw the band reteaming with Thorsten Brötzmann, who had previously produced three number-one singles for them.

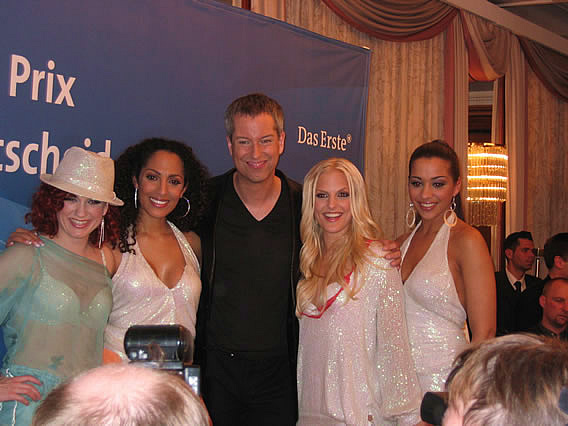
No Angels along with TV presenter Thomas Hermanns at the Grand Prix Vorentscheid 2008

Tim Hawes and Pete Kirtley from British production duo Jiant provided co-production on the piano-led ballad "Make a Change", an English language cover of the 2003 song "Reste Encore", recorded by French girl band and fellow Popstars winners L5 and initially produced by Fred Fraikin. No Angels's favourite song on Destiny, it was one of the first songs assuredly to be included on the album alongside dark ballad "Misguided Heart", another Jiant contribution, and "I Don't Wanna Talk About It". Production on the latter was overseen by Ivar Lisinski and David Clewett who also worked on the song "Secret's Out" that mixes soft rock and contemporary R&B elements. The quartet also collaborated with Swedish production team Ghost on "I Believe in You", and Arnthor Birgisson and Max Martin on "I Had a Feeling", both being remakes of the same-titled songs on Swedish singer Agnes Carlsson's 2006 album Stronger. As reported, "I Had a Feeling" occupied the longest work until complementation. Uptempo dance track "Been Here Before" was written and produced by Itchycoo band members Tobias Gustafsson and Mia Bergström and features distorted vocals. With an instrumentation that includes a pounding bass beat, electronic chords, and drum machine sounds, it has been described as the most experimental as well as the sexiest record on the album.

Thirteen out of a total of sixteen tracks made it to the final track listing of the standard album, while "Ain't Gonna Look the Other Way" and "Secret's Out" served a B-sides and were later included on the reissue of Destiny. Musically, No Angels have described the album as "more of a continuation" of earlier projects instead of a musical reorientation in the course of the reunion. Therefore, they decided to include "powerful up-tempo songs, beat-driven tracks and empathic ballads" which they considered similar to their pre-disbandment releases. However, although incorporating elements of rock, soul and dance music, the songs are mainly affected by keyboards and string instruments. When asked about the album's lyrics and their tendency to post-break up issues, Benaissa commented: "I'd say, we're offering a broad range [of topics] with different directions [...] We just chose [the songs] for their statements, their energy and the feeling." Although the quartet had several titles for the album in mind at one time or another, including "platitudinous und boring names such as Comeback, Reunion, Chapter Four and New Beginning", the title of the longplayer was actually inspired by a demo recording for the album, named "Destiny Calls". The record failed to make the cut on the final track listing, but widely served as a metaphor for the band's "emotional relation" to the band.

== Promotion ==
While Mölling and Benaissa initially favored "Back Off" to be released as the first single from Destiny, No Angels and their label eventually settled on the Redfly-penned mid-tempo ballad "Goodbye to Yesterday" to lead the album. Their first release after a three years absence from the charts, it reached number four on the German Singles Chart, and peaked within the top 20 in Switzerland and the top 30 in Austria. On 6 April 2007, it was announced that either "I Believe in You", "Been Here Before", "Maybe", or "I Had a Feeling" would be the next single from Destiny and Universal Music started an online poll asking the fans to decide. "Maybe", a Trine Rein cover, eventually won over piano-laid "I Believe in You", and was released on 15 June 2007. The song failed to chart in Switzerland and debuted and peaked at number 36 in Germany, becoming the band's lowest-charting single there, selling less than 15,000 copies up to then.

In October 2007, a third single, consisting of the hymn-like ballad "Amaze Me" and a previously unreleased, synth-heavy cover of American duo Womack & Womack's 1988 song "Teardrops" was released. The double A-single for which the band filmed two music videos, debuted and peaked at number 25 in Germany. Although expected to produce a fourth single, no further song from Destiny received single treatment. However, their previously unreleased 2008 song "Disappear", which served as Germany's entry for the 53rd Eurovision Song Contest 2008 in Belgrade and reached number four on the German Singles Chart, was later included on the Destiny Reloaded reissue of the album. It became the band's biggest-selling single during their reformation years, also reaching the top 30 of the Hungarian Airplay Chart and number 21 on Billboard's Eurochart Hot 100 Singles.

== Critical reception ==
Professional ratings
Review scores
Source	Rating
CDstarts.de	5/10 stars
laut.de	2/5 stars
letmeentertainyou.de	2/5 stars
Mazeplace	5/10 stars
musicheadquarter.de	8/10 stars
Valve	2.5/5 stars

Destiny received a mixed to negative reception from music critics, many of whom praised their vocal performances but found the material too generic and cliché-addled. Nana Heyman of Der Tagesspiegel complimented their effort and called Destiny a "solid pop album, well-produced, with no frills. But above all: Not larmoyant. After all that happened three and a half years ago, you could have expected that." Astrid Weist, writing for Musicheadquarter.de, noted that "the album proves that they have found their own style and developed it consistently." She found that while Destiny "offers no big surprises, except it may be more rocking than usual for the girls [...] the musical mix is quite balanced. The great voices of Sandy, Lucy, Jessica and Nadja sound wonderful in the solo passages and complement each other well in the polyphonic choruses – to a dense sound." Weist rated Destiny seven out of nine stars.

T-Online found that Destiny offers "solid girl band sound with isolated highlights" and wrote that the songs "sound familiar yet new. Vocally, all four have matured, but stylistically they re-start exactly where they left at the end of 2003 [...] And maybe that's just the problem: There is no big hit, no mega-hit for their furious comeback." The news portal felt that "many songs remain quite colorless, which is mainly due to the good, but also very smooth and styled production of the songs. For the most part, they lack surprises as well as creative and innovative moments." Laut.de journalist Katja Scherle declared the album a "girl power collage of the last fifteen years", and compared the sound on Destiny with the Spice Girls and Destiny's Child. She noted that "the new pieces are lush and instrumentally rich [and] feature No Angels-typical big chorus [..] Whether this is too much of the glitter produced, depends on the personal pathos preference. What you definitely can not deny is No Angels's vocal art: Now and then they fit wonderful together. And that's probably what brought the girls back together: The joy of singing."

Anton Tsuji from CDStarts.de wrote that "the problem with No Angels has always been that a lot of fillers hide between a handful of good to decent songs – and Destiny is no exception." He believed to recognize semi-plagiarism on songs such as "Been Here Before" and "Make a Change" which he considered ripoffs of Justin Timberlake's "SexyBack" and En Vogue's "Don't Let Go" and added: "As much as one would wish for the four remaining Angels, they certainly did not shoot down the bird with their comeback. The bottom line is a pretty mediocre album." Ruth Schneeberger und Jürgen Schmieder, writers for Süddeutsche Zeitung, noted that "listening to the album feels like chewing on an old Hubba Bubba, that is to squeezed to produce more bubbles." Highly critical with the album lyrics, they found that "every song sounds like the other: Probably the drum computer was broken, because it always plays the same beat [...] Everything is heartache [and] the drama is sighed for but the music sounds more like a boring autumn afternoon than a real emotion." In her ironic review for Die Welt, Johanna Merhof wrote that Destiny "sounds lovely. Like it was produced yesterday. Like created at the executive's office. Like a wet firecracker.

== Commercial performance ==
Released on 13 April 2007, Destiny debuted and peaked at number four on the German Albums Chart, while reaching number 14 in Austria and number 22 in Switzerland in the chart week ending 27 April 2007. It marked the band’s first standard studio album not to attain the top position in Germany, as well as their first not to enter the top ten in either Austria or Switzerland. On a broader scale, it was placed at number 14 on the European Top 100 Albums chart, compiled by Billboard. By June 2007, Destiny had sold approximately 30,000 copies. While plans for a Special Winter Edition of the album were eventually scrapped, both a Limited Pur Edition, containing the previously unreleased single "Disappear", and a Reloaded edition of the album, featuring previously unreleased remixes, b-sides, and a second disc with exclusive footage, were released on 14 March 2008. Following these releases, Destin re-entered the German Albums Chart at number 75 in the subsequent week.

== Impact and legacy ==
Although the group was aware that any placement other than number one would be interpreted as a commercial flop by the media, they were disappointed when their record company confirmed the impression by giving the band the choice of participating in the German pre-selection for the Eurovision Song Contest 2008 or being dropped. When asked about the underperformance of the album, Sandy Mölling admitted in a 2008 interview with Autona magazine that she would have re-worked the promotional strategy for the album following the mediocre success of the Destiny: "I love this album very much [but] the only thing I'd fault is the lack of courage [we had] when it came to selection of the singles. The album contains a lot more stronger songs, which would have been more daring [to the audience] probably." Lucy Diakovska, also blaming the band's lack of courage for Destiny's underperformance, further acknowledged in an interview with Hamburger Abendblatt the following year: "In music, it's dangerous to do the same thing again and again." In her 2010 autobiography Alles wird gut, Nadja Benaissa expressed her dislike of the album when she noted that follow-up Welcome to the Dance (2009) was the first No Angels project whose sound she supported wholeheartedly.

== Track listing ==
Destiny track listing
No.	Title	Writer(s)	Producer(s)	Length
1.	"Goodbye to Yesterday"	Niclas Molinder; Joacim Persson; Pelle Ankarberg; David Jassy	Twin	3:29
2.	"I Believe in You"	Johan Ekhé; Negin Djafari; Ulf Lindström	Ghost; Roland Spremberg^{[a]}	3:36
3.	"Been Here Before"	Tobias Gustafsson; Mia Bergström; Haakan Nils Ingvar Glante	Gustafsson; Michel Zitron; Vincent Pontare	3:04
4.	"Amaze Me"	Steve Mac; Karen Poole	Spremberg; Boogieman	3:47
5.	"Maybe"	Molinder; Persson; Ankarberg; Maryanne Morgan	Twin	3:23
6.	"I Had a Feeling"	Jörgen Elofsson; Arnthor Birgisson	Birgisson; AJ Junior & Kent Larsson; Max Martin^{[b]}	3:30
7.	"Make a Change"	Christina Rumbley; Peter Ibsen; Sacha Skarbek	Jiant; Snowflakers	3:37
8.	"Back Off"	Molinder; Persson; Ankarberg; Jassy	Twin; Ankarberg^{[a]}	4:25
9.	"What If"	Adrian Newman	Boogieman; Spremberg; Newman	4:10
10.	"I Don't Wanna Talk About It"	Ivar Lisinski; David Clewett; Djafari	Lisinski; Kriss K	4:26
11.	"Misguided Heart"	Steve Robson; Hannah Robinson	Jiant	4:08
12.	"A Reason"	Derek Bramble; Lindy Robbins; Dana Glover	Twin; GrooveFactory	4:13
13.	"The Rhythm of My Heart"	Andreas John; Erik McHoll; Hanne Sørvaag; Adrian Zag; Alexah Carlton; Mario Novack	Thorsten Brötzmann	3:00
Total length:				49:24

Online version – bonus track
No.	Title	Writer(s)	Producer(s)	Length
14.	"Goodbye to Yesterday" (Klaas Remix Long Cut)	Molinder; Persson; Ankarberg; Jassy	Twin; Klaas Gerung^{[a]}	6:21
Total length:				55:02

=== Destiny Reloaded ===
No.	Title	Writer(s)	Producer(s)	Length
1.	"Disappear"	Remee; Sørvaag; Thomas Troelsen	Remee; Troelsen	3:20
2.	"Been Here Before"	Gustafsson; Bergström; Glante	Gustafsson; Zitron; Pontare	3:04
3.	"Teardrops"	Cecil Womack; Linda Womack	Gustafsson; Zitron; Pontare	3:14
4.	"Amaze Me"	Mac; Poole	Spremberg; Boogieman	3:47
5.	"I Believe in You"	Ekhé; Djafari; Lindström	Ghost; Spremberg^{[a]}	3:36
6.	"I Had a Feeling"	Elofsson; Birgisson	Birgisson; AJ Junior & Larsson; Martin^{[b]}	3:30
7.	"Maybe" (Tomasino Remix)	Morgan; Molinder; Persson; Ankarberg	Twin; Tomasino^{[b]}	4:01
8.	"Make a Change"	Rumbley; Ibsen; Skarbek	Jiant; Snowflakers	3:37
9.	"Back Off"	Molinder; Persson; Ankarberg; Jassy	Twin; Ankarberg^{[a]}	4:25
10.	"Been Here Before" (Tomasino Remix)	Gustafsson; Bergström; Glante	Gustafsson; Zitron; Pontare; Tomasino^{[b]}	3:24
11.	"Misguided Heart"	Robson; Robinson	Jiant	4:08
12.	"I Don't Wanna Talk About It"	Lisinski; Clewett; Djafari	Lisinski; Kriss K	4:26
13.	"Maybe"	Morgan; Molinder; Persson; Ankarberg	Twin	3:23
14.	"Secret's Out"	Celetia Martin; Mats Berntoft; Magnus Wallbert	Lisinski; Kriss K.	3:14
15.	"What If"	Newman	Boogieman; Spremberg; Newman	4:10
16.	"Goodbye to Yesterday"	Molinder; Persson; Ankarberg; Jassy	Twin	3:29
17.	"A Reason"	Bramble; Robbins; Glover	Twin; GrooveFactory	4:13
18.	"Ain't Gonna Look the Other Way"	Tracy Ackerman; Anders Bagge; Peer Astrom	Harry Sommerdahl	3:49
19.	"The Rhythm of My Heart"	John; McHoll; Sørvaag; Zag; Carlton; Novack	Brötzmann	3:00
Total length:				69:20

Bonus DVD
No.	Title	Length
1.	"No Angels – Live in Concert"	39:16
2.	"No Angels – The New Videocollection" (incl. Making-ofs)
3.	"No Angels – Photo Slideshow"

Notes

- ^{^a} signifies a co-producer
- ^{^b} signifies an additional producer

Sampling credits

- "I Believe in You" contains an uncredited sample of Supertramp's "Breakfast in America"; is a cover of Agnes' song from her 2006 album Stronger
- "Maybe" contains an uncredited sample of The Beatles' 1969 record "Come Together"; is a cover of Trine Rein's 2006 song
- "I Had a Feeling" is a cover of Agnes' song from her 2006 album Stronger
- "Make a Change" is an English-language cover of French girl band L5's song "Reste Encore" from their 2002 album Retiens-Moi
- "I Don't Wanna Talk About It" is a cover of Ira Losco's "Don't Wanna Talk About It" from her 2005 album Accident Prone
- "A Reason" is a cover of Dana Glover's song from her 2002 album Testimony
- "Teardrops" is a cover of Womack & Womack's 1988 single from their album Conscience
- "Ain't Gonna Look the Other Way" is a cover of Celine Dion's 2004 song from her live album A New Day... Live in Las Vegas

== Charts ==
Chart performance for Destiny
Chart (2007)	Peak position
Austrian Albums (Ö3 Austria)	14
European Top 100 Albums (Billboard)	14
German Albums (Offizielle Top 100)	4
Swiss Albums (Schweizer Hitparade)	22

== Release history ==
Destiny release history
Region	Date	Edition	Format	Label	Ref.
Austria	13 April 2007	Standard	CD; digital download	Polydor; Universal	
Germany	13 April 2007	Standard	CD; digital download	Polydor; Universal	
Switzerland	13 April 2007	Standard	CD; digital download	Polydor; Universal	
Austria	14 March 2008	Reloaded reissue	CD; digital download; DVD	Polydor; Universal	
Germany	14 March 2008	Reloaded reissue	CD; digital download; DVD	Polydor; Universal	
Switzerland	14 March 2008	Reloaded reissue	CD; digital download; DVD	Polydor; Universal	
