= Disappear (No Angels song) =

2008 single by No Angels

Single by No Angels

from the album Destiny Reloaded
- Released: 29 February 2008
- Recorded: 22 December 2007
- Studio: Gutleutstudios (Frankfurt am Main)
- Length: 3:19 (single version); 3:00 (ESC edit)
- Label: Polydor; Universal
- Songwriters: Remee; Hanne Sørvaag; Thomas Troelsen
- Producers: Remee; Thomas Troelsen

No Angels singles chronology
"Amaze Me" / "Teardrops" (2007)	"Disappear" (2008)	"One Life" (2009)

Eurovision Song Contest 2008 entry
- Country: Germany
- Artists: Nadja Benaissa; Lucy Diakovska; Sandy Mölling; Jessica Wahls
- As: No Angels
- Language: English
- Composers: Remee; Hanne Sørvaag; Thomas Troelsen
- Lyricists: Remee; Hanne Sørvaag; Thomas Troelsen

Finals performance
- Final result: 23rd
- Final points: 14

Entry chronology
- ◄ "Frauen regier'n die Welt" (2007)
- "Miss Kiss Kiss Bang" (2009) ►

"Disappear" is a song recorded by all-female German pop group No Angels, taken from Destiny Reloaded (2008), the reissue of their fourth studio album. It was written by Norwegian singer-songwriter Hanne Sørvaag along with Danish musicians Remee and Thomas Troelsen, the latter of which also handled production on the track. A mid-paced pop song that is built on a ticking clock sample, the song is influenced by elements of Europop and synthpop. Its instrumentation consists essentially of synthesizers and keyboards. Lyrically, it finds the protagonist thinking deeply over her relationship with her love interest from whom she parted; however, she still pines for him and feels self-conscious for doing so.

A shortened version of the song served as Germany's entry for the 53rd Eurovision Song Contest 2008 in Belgrade, having earned tight 50.5% of the audience vote over solo singer Carolin Fortenbacher at the national pre-selection show, Grand Prix Vorentscheid, in March 2008. In the final show of the ESC, on 24 May 2008, the song finished 23rd (out of 25) in the final voting, having earned a total of fourteen points only. Released as a single on 29 February 2008 in German-speaking Europe, the song reached number 4 on the German Singles Chart, where it became the band's biggest-selling single since their reformation in fall 2006. "Disappear" also reached the top 30 of the Hungarian Airplay Chart, the top 40 of the Ö3 Austria Top 40 and peaked at number 21 on the composite Eurochart Hot 100 Singles chart.

A music video for the song, directed and produced by Daniel Lwowski, was filmed at Schloss Marquardt palace in Potsdam in January 2008 and co-stars German actor Oliver Mommsen in a supporting role. It depicts the band as ghost-like entities, who are awakened when a foreigner visits heir home. Throughout the video, each of them tries to approach him in different ways. "Disappear" was performed on several television such as Willkommen bei Carmen Nebel, Unsere Besten and the Bulgarian version of Music Idol. It was later featured on their compilation album Very Best of No Angels (2008) and made part of the setlist of the band's 2022 Celebration Tour.

== Writing and recording ==
"Disappear" was written by Norwegian singer–songwriter Hanne Sørvaag along with Danish musicians Remee and Thomas Troelsen, while production was handled by Remee and Troelsen. It was mixed by Will Simms and engineered by Savvas Iossifidis. Vocal editing was handled by Nicolaj Rasted. First drafts of a melody for "Disappear" were already in existence in 2005, with Troelsen, who also wrote the vocal melody, intensifying work on the track in January 2006. However, it took until 5 November 2007 for the song to be fully produced and provided with its final lyrics, which chronicle the aftermath of an unforgettable love affair. A Sørvaag-sung demo version of the song was recorded at the Delta Lab Recording Studios in Copenhagen and leaked through her MySpace account on 10 March 2008.

Sørvaag's demo recording was eventually presented to A&R manager Niklas Hafemann and No Angels. One of several songs proposed for recording, "Disappear" was eventually accepted as the band's competition song for the German national final Grand Prix Vorentscheid 2008. The vocals for their version were recorded at the Gutleutstudios in Frankfurt am Main on 22 December 2007. Nadja Benaissa has described the song as an earworm with international ambition: "[It's] an emotional, very sentimental [song]. With music, that's raising your spirits and carries away." The song premiered during an official press conference on 29 January 2008; the same day a thirty-seconds clip of the song was previewed on the band's official fansite. A day later the song was officially serviced to European radio. On 21 February 2008 an edited version of "Disappear" premiered on the website of daily newspaper Bild-Zeitung, which was shortened to meet the three-minutes or less ESC conditions in length.

== Release and reception ==
Released on 29 February 2008 in German-speaking Europe, both the official CD single and the digital download single include three remixes by the Mozart & Friends team of music producers. The atmospheric Yin Yang remix is based on a piano performance by Australian producer Alf Tuohey and was refined by Marc Mozart with "trip-hop-esque" drumloops. Alexander Hahn contributed a trancy housemix of "Disappear," which was performed at his Chartlab Studio based in the center of Hamburg, Germany. The Soundbomb House remix has been declared "the heavier of the two house-mixes with plenty of traditional German techno elements;" the basic tracks were programmed by Manuel Loyo and Alexander Gernert, while Mozart added synthesisers.

Upon its release, "Disappear" debuted at number 12 on the German Singles Chart based on composite digital singles and CD singles sales. Following the band's participation and subsequent winning of the Grand Prix Vorentscheid it rose eight places to number 4 in its second week, making it both the biggest-moving single of the week and No Angels' first top 10 entry (twelfth in total) since their 2007 comeback single "Goodbye to Yesterday" which peaked at the same position. The single eventually spent 14 weeks on that particular chart, also making it their longest-charting single since 2002's "Still in Love with You." On Media Control's component charts "Disappear" reached number 2 on the German download chart as well as number 16 on the official airplay charts, according to Nielsen Music Control. It was ranked seventy-eighth on the German year-end chart.

In Austria, the single opened at number 63 on the Ö3 Austria Top 40 chart. As on the German Singles Chart, sales were pushed by the Grand Prix Vorentscheid results and thus, it rose twenty-six places to number 37 in its second week of release, the group's highest peak since "Goodbye to Yesterday." The song remained another two weeks on the chart, but re-entered the top 100 at number 74 two weeks after the Eurovision Song Contest 2008. In Switzerland, the track became the group's first top 100 entry since "Goodbye to Yesterday" after the commercial failure of "Maybe" and "Amaze Me"/"Teardrops" the previous year, debuting and peaking at number 96. On a composite Eurochart Hot 100 Singles the song debuted at number 46 in the week of 22 March 2008, before jumping to number 21 the following week. Benefiting from strong airplay on foreign music markets, the single also peaked at number 22 on the Hungarian Mahasz Radio Chart, the band's first entry since "Still in Love with You" (2002).

== Music video ==
Band member Lucy Diakovska at a balcony on the Potsdam set of "Disappear" (January 2008).

An accompanying music video for "Disappear", directed and produced by Daniel Lwowski for Katapult Film, was filmed on 23 January 2008 at Schloss Marquardt, a palace complex, which is located about 15 km northwest of the city center in the same-titled Potsdam, Brandenburg district. Shooting lasted until 2:00am GMT of the 24th due to operating delays. German actor Oliver Mommsen was asked to play a supporting role in the clip immediately after meeting band members Lucy Diakovska and Jessica Wahls at German NDR talk show Die Tietjen und Dibaba.

The video opens with a scene of Mommsen discovering a remote mansion in a seemingly deserted rural region, following the breakdown of his car, a BMW 2000. Deciding to search for help, he enters the empty antiquated building, which is occupied by four ghost-like entities (played by No Angels), whose interest he awakes. Throughout the video, each of them tries to approach him in different ways, without touching him or being seen by him. However, every time he feels their presence and is tempted to catch a view of the beings, they disappear.

The visuals world premiered on 5 February 2008 on German music network Viva's show Viva Live. On 21 February 2008, Bild.de, the official website of the daily Bild-Zeitung, released a shortened version of video, which served as the official version for the ESC to meet the guidelines of the contest. The fully animated clip features previously unreleased pictures and short videos of the band. A making-of-clip of the video was released on a digital video disc on the reissue of the band's previous album Destiny, Destiny Reloaded (2008).

== Eurovision Song Contest ==
=== National final ===
Wahls, Diakovska, Benaissa and Mölling during their performance at the national final on 6 March 2008 in Hamburg.

Following the moderate commercial success of their comeback album Destiny (2007), Universal Music forced the group to either casting a new fifth band member or entering the national pre-selection competition for the Eurovision Song Contest 2008, if they wanted to produce another album with the label. While the former idea was discarded immediately, the band agreed to participate in the pre-selection on the premise that the company would produce and release another studio album with them. In January 2008, it was announced that the group and "Disappear" had qualified for Wer singt für Deutschland, the German national final, organised and broadcast by Das Erste and Norddeutscher Rundfunk (NDR). Having refused previous offers to participate in the pre-selection, it was the second time the band was asked to submit a song for the contest since their reunion in early 2007. Controversy occurred when several news sources reported that the writers of the track were alleged to have plagiarised several elements from SSDSDSSWEMUGABRTLAD contestant Steffi List's recording "Breaking the Silence" without giving credit or compensation. However, while investigators verified similarities in rhythm and phrasing, NDR eventually denied any existing evidence proving this argument as "Disappear" was written and recorded prior to List's song.

Following several weeks of promotional appearances, No Angels entered the competition on 6 March 2008 at the Deutsche Schauspielhaus in Hamburg, competing against all-male groups Marquess and Cinema Bizarre, and solo singers Tommy Reeve and Carolin Fortenbacher. Dressed in white color, No Angels hit the stage as the fifth entry of the evening, opening via lifting platform. During their performance their outfits transformed, with silken capes in orange, pink, purple, and blue coming from their dresses. Four wind machine were specially-installed on-stage for their performance. After the five songs had been performed, televoters decided about the top two songs in the superfinal which were then voted on again. Widely considered as early favourites by the media, the band eventually finished first, having earned tight 50.5% of the audience vote over Fortenbacher in the second and final election round, while the other three participants were ranked joint third.

=== ESC final ===
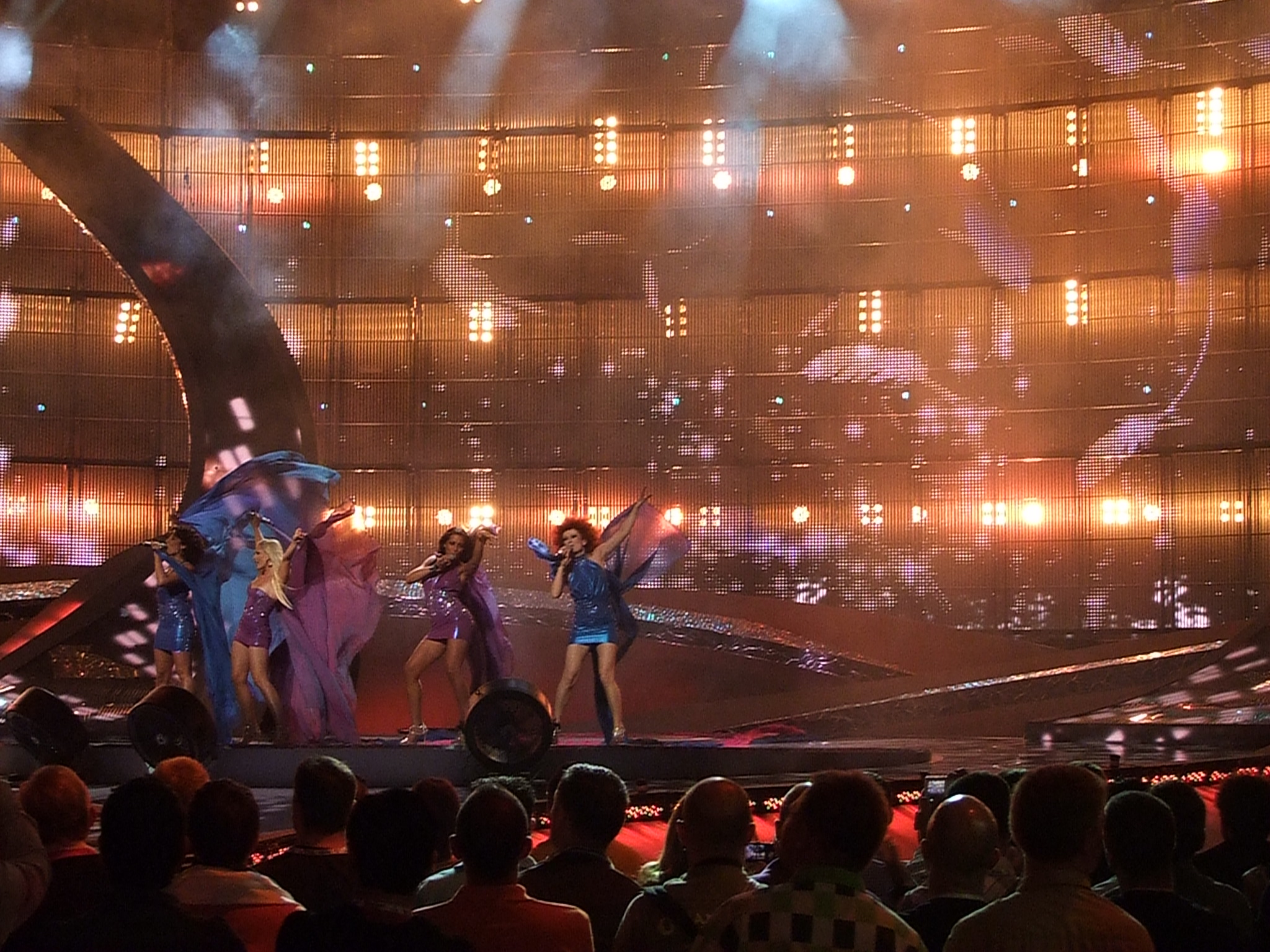
No Angels during their performance at the Eurovision Song Contest finals in Belgrade on 24 May 2008.

With Germany being one of the biggest financial contributors to the European Broadcasting Union (EBU), No Angels – alongside their competing entries from France, Spain, the United Kingdom and hosting country Serbia – were allowed to skip the contest's semi-finals and automatically qualified for competition with 24 other countries in the finals of the Eurovision Song Contest 2008. In the run-up to the final, the band's performance was intensively revised to differ from the Grand Prix Vorentscheid. While their stage clothes had been changed into two blue and two purple dresses with two capes each, a new choreography was added; the LED projections in the back of the stage showed flying feathers on a blue ground and moreover, pyrotechnics were included. Wahls who had infected with chickenpox before their arrival in Belgrade, was forced to remain in quarantine until the evening of the final. Her illness temporarily called into question whether the group would even be able to compete. During rehearsals, one of the group's backing vocalist filled in for her.

On 24 May 2008, with Wahls declared healthy, No Angels started at number four during the show, following Albania's entry Olta Boka with "Zemrën e lamë peng" and preceding Armenia's Sirusho with "Qele Qele." An estimated 100 million fans watched the show, and viewers from all 43 participating nations voted for their favourite performers via text message and telephone. The band eventually ranked 23rd place out of the 25 countries that participated with a total of 14 points – taking twelve points from Bulgaria, Diakovska's native country, and two points from Switzerland. Only Poland and the United Kingdom placed below the four-member female band. While never considered a pre-contest favourite (online betting firms such as Paddy Power previously put Germany's chances of winning at 100 to 1, in the lowest third of competitors), the band was heavily criticized for their performance, which they themselves later described as a failure, attributing bad in-ear sound and a high level of stage fright. As a direct consequence, planned recordings for the band's next studio album during the summer were indefinitely delayed, and the group went on a two-month hiatus to rethink and analyze the past year. The following year, "Disappear" was succeeded as German representative at the Eurovision Song Contest 2009 by Alex Swings Oscar Sings (Alex C. and Oscar Loya) with "Miss Kiss Kiss Bang."

== Track listings ==
CD Maxi single
No.	Title	Producer(s)	Length
1.	"Disappear" (Single Version)	Remee; Troelsen	3:19
2.	"Disappear" (Yin Yang Remix)	Remee; Troelsen; Alf Tuohey^{[A]}; Marc Mozart^{[A]}	4:13
3.	"Disappear" (Chartlab House Remix)	Remee; Troelsen; Alexander Hahn^{[A]}	5:22
4.	"Disappear" (Soundbomb House Remix)	Remee; Troelsen; Alexander Gernert^{[A]}; Manuel Loyo^{[A]}; Mozart^{[A]}	5:01
5.	"Disappear" (Music Video)		3:35

Digital single
No.	Title	Producer(s)	Length
1.	"Disappear" (Single Version)	Remee; Troelsen	3:19
2.	"Disappear" (Yin Yang Remix)	Remee; Troelsen; Tuohey^{[A]}; Mozart^{[A]}	4:13
3.	"Disappear" (Chartlab House Remix)	Remee; Troelsen; Hahn^{[A]}	5:22
4.	"Disappear" (Soundbomb House Remix)	Remee; Troelsen; Gernert^{[A]}; Loyo^{[A]}; Mozart^{[A]}	5:01

Notes

- ^{^[A]} denotes additional producer

== Credits and personnel ==
Credits taken from Destiny Reloaded liner notes.

- Nadja Benaissa – vocals
- Lucy Diakovska – vocals
- Marijo Dolic – vocal recording
- Trevor U. Hurst – vocal recording
- Sawas Iossifidis – mixing engineer
- Sandy Mölling – vocals
- Nicolaj Rasted – vocal editing
- Remee – producer, writer
- Götz-Michael Rieth – mastering
- Will Simms – mixing
- Hanne Sørvaag – writer
- Thomas Troelsen – producer, writer
- Jessica Wahls – vocals

== Charts ==
=== Weekly charts ===
Weekly chart performance for "Disappear"
Chart (2008)	Peak position
Austria (Ö3 Austria Top 40)	37
European Hot 100 Singles (Billboard)	21
Germany (Official Airplay Chart)	29
Germany (GfK)	4
Hungary (Rádiós Top 40)	16
Switzerland (Schweizer Hitparade)	96

=== Year-end charts ===
Year-end chart performance for "Disappear"
Chart (2008)	Position
Germany (Official German Charts)	78
Hungary (Rádiós Top 40)	74

== Release history ==
Release dates and formats for "Disappear"
Region	Date	Format	Label	Ref
Various	29 February 2008	CD single; digital download	Polydor; Universal	
