= Maybe (No Angels song) =

Single by No Angels

from the album Destiny
- Released: 15 June 2007
- Recorded: January 2007
- Studio: Sound Studio N (Cologne, Germany)
- Length: 3:23
- Label: Polydor; Universal
- Songwriters: Pelle Ankarberg; Niclas Molinder; Maryanne Morgan; Joacim Persson
- Producer: Twin

No Angels singles chronology
"Goodbye to Yesterday" (2007)	"Maybe" (2007)	"Amaze Me" / "Teardrops" (2007)

"Maybe" is a song performed by all-female German pop group No Angels. It was written and composed by Pelle Ankarberg, Niclas Molinder, Maryann Morgan, and Joacim Persson and originally recorded by American-Norwegian pop singer Trine Rein, featuring strings by violinist Andreas Ljones. An uplifting pop rock song that features a heavy guitar riff sample, it incorporates an uncredited sample of The Beatles' 1969 number-one record "Come Together", while its lyrics revolve around relationship that is built upon contingence and hesitancy.

In October 2006, Rein and Ljones qualified for the Melodi Grand Prix 2007 with the song, the television show in which the Norwegian entry for the Eurovision Song Contest 2007 was chosen. It eventually finished the contest in the final round, losing to Guri Schanke's "Ven a bailar conmigo". The same year, "Maybe" was also recorded by the re-formed No Angels for their fourth studio album, Destiny (2007). Produced by frequent collaborators Twin from Redfly Music, it was selected as album's second single and released on 15 June 2007 in German-speaking Europe, where it reached number 36 on the German Singles Chart and number 62 on the Ö3 Austria Top 40 chart, becoming one of the band's lowest-charting single up to then.

== Background ==
"Maybe" was written by Redfly production members Pelle Ankarberg, Niclas Molinder, Joacim Persson and British songwriter Maryanne Morgan, and actually offered to Norwegian pop singer Trine Rein, who recorded the song in mid-2006 for her unreleased studio album. Violinist Andreas Ljones contributed additional fiddle music to Rein's version which was picked for her participation in the Melodi Grand Prix 2007, the Norwegian pre-selection of the Eurovision Song Contest. Chosen out of a total of 464 songs, it eventually made the final selection of the eighteen participating entries. While the song failed to succeed on the semi-finals, it eventually made the second chance round, before dashing once again in the final round on 10 February 2007, losing to Guri Schanke's "Ven a bailar conmigo" which would later place 18th in a field of 28 and failed to qualify Norway for the final.

After No Angels' secret reunion in mid-2006, Redfly offered the band to re-recorded the song for fourth studio album Destiny, having previously contributed to their 2003 studio album Pure as well as several solo projects. Although the track was not exclusively for the quartet, the band has described the mid-tempo song as a "typical No Angels" record: "This song rocks! [...] It shows another facet of us and is absolutely in line [with the band]." Nadja Benaissa called "Maybe" the "jiggiest title" on the album: "It's about being in a quandary," she said in an interview with Bild-Zeitung, "and about living along the lines of 'maybe yes - maybe no'..." The quartet premiered the song during a special concert in the Radio Energy studios in Munich, Germany on 5 March 2007, and by 6 April it was announced that either "I Believe in You," "Been Here Before," "Maybe," or "I Had a Feeling" would be the next single and Universal started a poll asking the fans to decide. However, according to Bild am Sonntag "Maybe" eventually won over piano-laid "I Believe in You."

== Release and reception ==
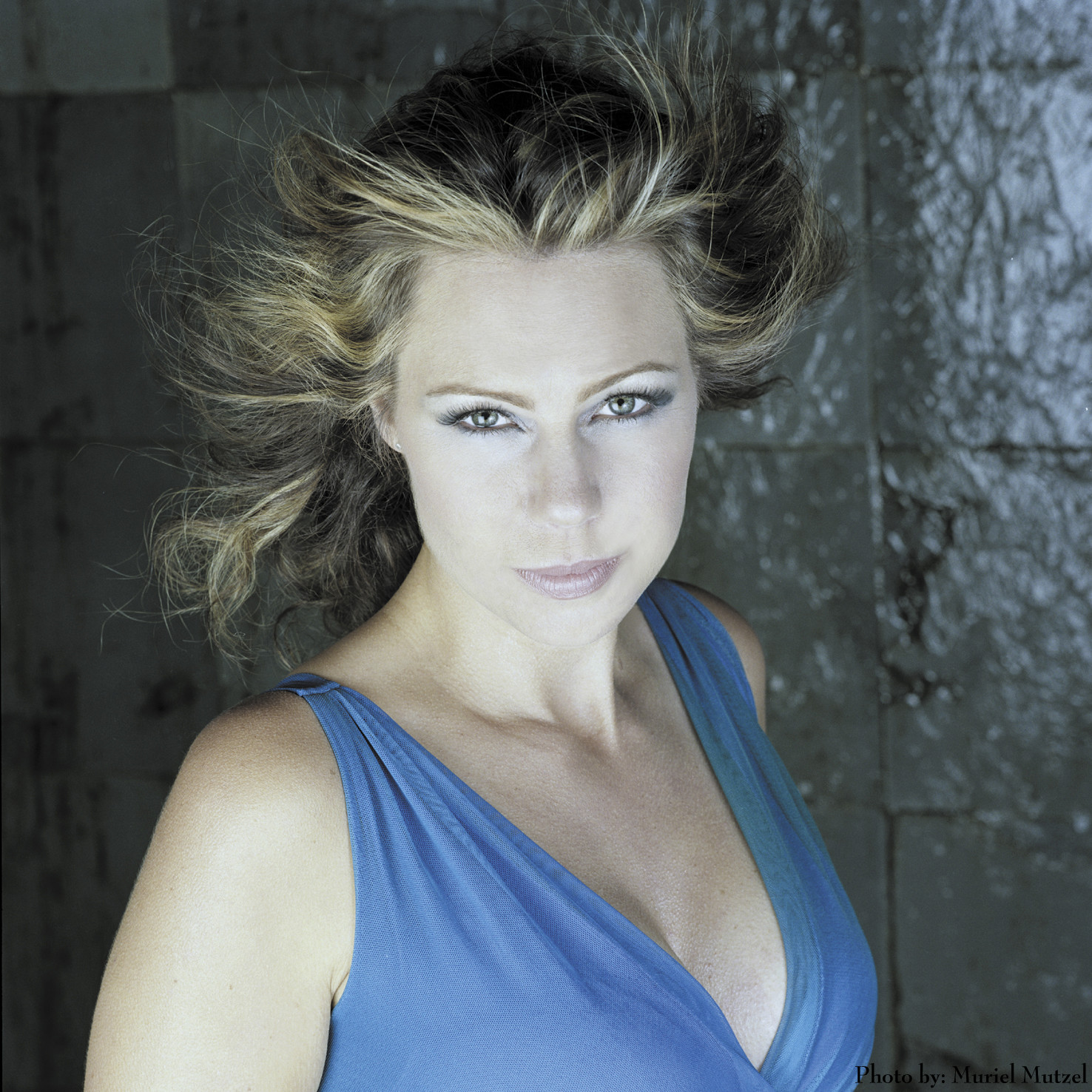
Trine Rein's (pictured) original version of "Maybe" received limited release only.

In 2007, Rein's version of "Maybe" received a release on the MGP compilation album Melodi Grand Prix 2007 only. No Angels' version was first released on the Destiny album on 13 April 2007 and later shipped as a single to radios in late May 2007. While the CD single spawned the previously unreleased recording "Secret's Out", a song penned by Celetia Martin, Mats Berntoft, and Magnus Wallbert, its digital single included a special piano-driven remix. A second dance-pop-driven remix of the song, re-arranged by producer Tomasino, appeared on the album's 2008 re-release Destiny Reloaded.

First released on 15 June 2007 in German-speaking Europe, "Maybe" debuted at number 36 on the German Singles Chart based on composite digital single and CD maxi single sales, making it the band's lowest-debuting entry to date. As the single fell out of the top 50 in it second week and failed to climb again during its seven-week chart run, it would become the band's first single to miss the top 20 on that particular chart, thus also making it the group's lowest-charting single since their formation in autumn 2000. On the component charts, the track peaked at number 70 on the German Airplay Chart, according to Nielsen SoundScan.

In Austria, the track debuted at number 62 on the Ö3 Austria Top 40, the group's lowest peak to date. It remained a single week on the chart and fell out of the top 75 in its second week of release, also making it the band's shortest-running single on the Austrian Singles Chart. In Switzerland, "Maybe" never made it to the official top 100 chart, eventually becoming No Angels' second entry since 2002's "Let's Go to Bed" to do so. As a result, the single also failed to chart on the Eurochart Hot 100 Singles. Altogether, "Maybe" sold less than 15,000 copies Europe-wide. It was the group's lowest-selling release up to then.

== Music video ==
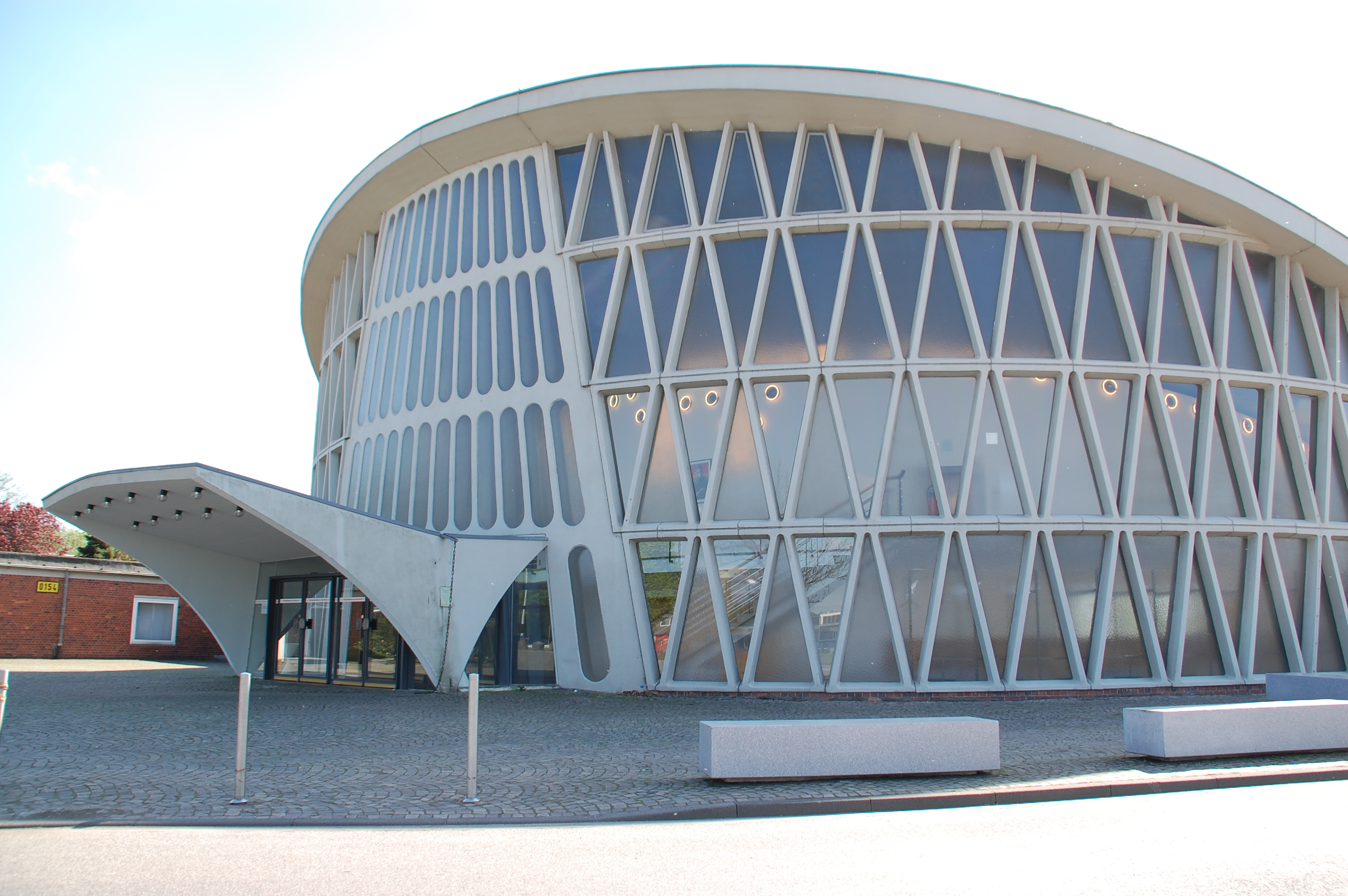
The music video for "Maybe" was filmed at the Feierabendhaus in Knapsack (pictured).

The music video for "Maybe" was filmed on 4 May 2007 inside the Feierabendhaus at the Chemiepark in Knapsack, Germany, following a four-day dance and choreography training. It was No Angels' seventh clip to be directed by Marcus Sternberg, and features You Can Dance contestant Jimmy Surles as well as former Fame Academy contestant and Become One member David Hernandez Sanchez, the choreographer of the clip. The video world-premiered on 18 May 2007 on German music network VIVA's show VIVA Live. A making-of-clip of the video was released on a digital video disc on the album's re-release edition, Destiny Reloaded (2008).

Similar to previous single "Goodbye to Yesterday" the video does not have a substantial plot; it mainly focuses on the girls and their dancing choreographies, finally merging into a boisterous party crowd near the end of the clip. Upon its release the music video was widely advertised as the band's "sexiest video" to date, a fact underlined by the band's own statements: "We wanted a cool and sexy video, that facilitates a lot of energy," Jessica Wahls said in an interview with the Making of crew. As Nadja Benaissa reported on the band's Bunte blog, the band members had purchased several parts of their outfits in a local sex shop.

== Track listings ==
CD single
No.	Title	Writer(s)	Producer(s)	Length
1.	"Maybe" (Radio Edit)	Niclas Molinder; Joacim Persson; Pelle Ankarberg; Maryanne Morgan	Twin	3:23
2.	"Secret's Out"	Celetia Martin; Mats Berntoft; Magnus Wallbert	Ivar Lisinski; Kriss K	3:13
3.	"Maybe" (Piano Mix)	Molinder; Persson; Ankarberg; Morgan	Twin	3:13

CD maxi single
No.	Title	Writer(s)	Producer(s)	Length
1.	"Maybe" (Radio Edit)	Molinder; Persson; Ankarberg; Morgan	Twin	3:23
2.	"Secret's Out"	Martin; Berntoft; Wallbert	Lisinski; Kriss K	3:13

== Credits and personnel ==
Credits taken from Destiny liner notes.

- Pelle Ankarberg – backing vocals arrangement
- Nadja Benaissa – vocals
- Lucy Diakovska – vocals
- Sandy Mölling – vocals
- Joacim Persson – guitars
- Vincent Sorg – mastering
- Twin – production, arrangement
- Jessica Wahls – vocals

== Charts ==
Chart performance for "Maybe"
Chart (2007)	Peak position
Austria (Ö3 Austria Top 40)	62
Germany (GfK)	36

== Release history ==
Release dates and formats for "Maybe"
Region	Date	Format	Label	Ref
Various	15 June 2007	CD single; digital download	Polydor; Universal	
