= Twin (production team) =

Swedish record production and songwriting team

- Origin: Sweden
- Genres: Pop, dance-pop, pop rock, R&B, teen pop
- Occupation: Producers
- Years active: 2002-present
- Members: Niclas Molinder; Joacim Persson

Twin (sometimes written as TWIN) is a Swedish record production and songwriting team, consisting of Niclas Molinder and Joacim Persson.

== Production and songwriting discography ==
=== 2001 ===
==== Charlotte Perrelli - Miss Jealousy ====
- 02. "Miss Jealousy"
- 06. "One Kiss Away"

=== 2002 ===
==== Amber - Naked ====
- 07. "Sex Without Sex"

==== Da Buzz - Wanna Be with Me ====
- 05. "Keep On Lovin' Me"
- 07. "Wonder Where You Are"

==== Gloria Gaynor - I Wish You Love ====
- 01. "Gotta Be Forever"
- 05. "All the Man That I Need"

=== 2003 ===
==== No Angels - Pure ====
- 02. "Eleven Out of Ten"
- 08. "Feelgood Lies"

==== Sophie Monk - Calendar Girl ====
- 05. "Love Thing"
- 09. "Step Back to Love"

==== Play - Replay ====
- 08. "11 Out of 10"

==== Snap! - The Cult of Snap! ====
- 09. "When You're Near"

==== S Club 8 - Sundown ====
- 09. "Sundown"

==== Belinda - Belinda ====
- 01. "Lo Siento"

=== 2004 ===
==== American Juniors - American Juniors ====
- 09. "Sundown"

==== Bubbles - Blow The Spot ====
- 01. "Blow The Spot"

==== Die Schlümpfe - The Smurfs ====
- 02. "Einmal"

==== Charlotte Perrelli - Gone Too Long ====
- 07. "All by Myself"
- 10. "Tell Me"

==== Sandy Mölling - Unexpected ====
- 02. "Say It Again"
- 03. "Unnatural Blonde"
- 05. "Tell Me"
- 07. "Sorry, You've Got the Wrong Girl"
- 09. "Do It All Over"
- 11. "All Eyes On You"

=== 2005 ===
==== Agnes - Agnes ====
- 01. "Stranded"

==== Bratz - Rock Angelz ====
- 03. "I Don't Care"
- 04. "All About You"
- 05. "Who I Am"
- 06. "So What"
- 09. "Lookin' Good"
- 10. "Rock the World"
- 14. "Hey (When the Angelz Play)"

=== 2006 ===
==== Sandy Mölling - Frame of Mind ====
- 12. "Speed Of Love"

==== Helena Paparizou - The Game of Love ====
- 08. "Heroes"

==== Velvet - Finally ====
- 03. "Mi Amore"
- 04. "Doin' It"

==== Bratz - Forever Diamondz ====
- 01. "Ooooh Fashion"
- 02. "Wazz Up"
- 03. "Keep It Up"
- 04. "Best Friends"
- 07. "Express Yourself"
- 14. "Que Tal"

=== 2007 ===
==== Ashley Tisdale - Headstrong ====
- 04. "Be Good to Me"
- 05. "Not Like That"
- 09. "Goin' Crazy"

==== Dannii Minogue - Unleashed ====
- 19. "Via L'amour" (iTunes Bonus track)

==== Danny - Heart Beats ====
- 10. "Together Some Day"
- 11. "Stay"

==== No Angels - Destiny ====
- 01. "Goodbye to Yesterday"
- 05. "Maybe"
- 08. "Back Off"

==== Tiffany Affair - Over It ====
- 01. "Over It"

=== 2008 ===
==== Velvet - The Queen ====
- 09. "Déjà Vu"

==== Darin - Flashback ====
- 12. "What If"

==== The Cheetah Girls - The Cheetah Girls: One World ====
- 01. "Cheetah Love"
- 07. "I'm the One"

=== 2009 ===
==== Ashley Tisdale - Guilty Pleasure ====
- 01. "Acting Out"
- 02. "It's Alright, It's OK"
- 04. "Overrated"
- 08. "What If"
- 09. "Erase And Rewind"
- 13. "Crank It Up"
- 16. "Whatcha Waiting For"
- 00. "History" (unreleased)

==== V Factory - Untitled debut album ====
- 00. "Love Struck"

=== 2010 ===
==== Camp Rock 2: The Final Jam - soundtrack ====
- 13. "Walkin' In My Shoes" (bonus track)

==== Charice - Charice ====
- 01. "Pyramid"
- 11. "I Did It for You"

==== Avalon High soundtrack ====
- "Destiny" - performed by Play

=== 2011 ===
==== Lemonade Mouth Soundtrack ====
- 01. Determinate
- 02. Breakthrough

==== Willow Smith - "Willow" ====
- 02. "21st Century Girl"
- 00. "Fireball (featuring Nicki Minaj)"

==== Shake It Up: Break It Down Soundtrack ====
- 10. Roll The Dice
- 11. Just Wanna Dance
- 12. Our Generation

==== Lady Gaga ====
- 01. Marry The Night David Jost & Twin Radio Remix

=== 2012 ===
==== Blush - Single from the album Shake It Up: Live 2 Dance ====
- 01. Up, Up, and Away

==== Shake It Up: Live 2 Dance Soundtrack ====
- 04. Up, Up, and Away
- 06. Make Your Mark
- 11. Bring the Fire
