= Amaze Me =

Single by No Angels

from the album Destiny
- A-side: "Teardrops"
- Released: 19 October 2007
- Recorded: January 2007
- Studio: Sound Studio N (Cologne, Germany)
- Length: 3:48
- Label: Polydor; Universal
- Songwriters: Karen Poole; Steve Mac
- Producers: Roland Spremberg; Boogieman

No Angels singles chronology
"Maybe" (2007)	"Amaze Me" / "Teardrops" (2007)	"Disappear" (2008)

"Amaze Me" is a song performed by all-female German pop group No Angels. It was written by British songwriters Steve Mac and Karen Poole, and produced by Boogieman and Roland Spremberg for the band's comeback album, their fourth full-length studio album Destiny (2007). Musically, the song is a pulsating hymn-like pop ballad. Lyrically, "Amaze Me" is an ode to love. Still amazed by her lover, the female protagonist sings that she feels happy their relationship has lasted through good and bad times over the years.

Released to positive reviews by music critics, the song was released as the album's third single as a double A-single along with the Womack & Womack cover "Teardrops" on 19 October 2007 in German-speaking Europe. The song reached number 25 on the German Singles Chart, but failed to enter the national charts elsewhere, eventually becoming one of the group's lowest-charting singles. Slightly more successful than its predecessor "Maybe" however, it managed to reach the composite Billboard Eurochart Hot 100 Singles chart. In 2013, English boy band Union J recorded a cover of the song for their self-titled debut album.

== Background ==
In mid-2006, No Angels member Lucy Diakovska approached her former bandmates to arrange a first meeting with all original band members for years following their disbandment in December 2003. While Vanessa Petruo refused to re-join the band in favour of an independent solo career in music and film, all other members of the original line-up agreed upon Diakovska's request to reunite for a musical comeback, and the band eventually took action to prepare their next album in secrecy from public.

Requested by the No Angels's A&R manager Niklas Hafemann, "Amaze Me" was one of several exclusively-penned tracks for the band's comeback album Destiny. Penned by English songwriters Karen Poole and Steve Mac, it was co-produced by Boogieman and Roland Spremberg for the album. Mixing was handled by the former, while Spremberg provided all instruments, including the guitar, keyboards, and a bass. Engineering was overseen by Nico Schuette.

"Amaze Me" was one of the first tracks to be recorded by the group and among a total of seven candidates considered for the album's lead single. Although it lost in favour of "Goodbye to Yesterday," the band members have described the ballad as one of their personal favourites on the album. "We instantly fell in love with the song, because it has a very special atmosphere. It's carrying off, no matter where you are," Nadja Benaissa told RTL Television, with Lucy Diakovska adding: "Each of us could easily build a relation [to it]. It's about a feeling, [that] everyone knows: You're absolutely amazed by someone, who is mesmerizing you with his charme and acts." Jessica Wahls called the song "soul- and heart-touching", stating: "But it's not a slow song, it is pulsating."

== Release and reception ==
The quartet premiered the song during a special concert in the Radio Energy studios in Munich, Germany on 5 March 2007. On 29 March a thirty-second preview of the song was made available on Musicload, and by 6 April 2007 a one-and-a-half-minute clip had leaked onto the internet via pop24, the band's label's promotional website. Released on various editions, a dance music-influenced remix of the song, also produced by Boogieman, appeared on both the "Amaze Me" edition of the CD single and the digital single.

== Music video ==
The music video for "Amaze Me" was directed by Marcus Sternberg and filmed on 21 August 2007 in a film studio in Berlin, Germany. Shot over twenty-two hours back-to-back with the video for "Teardrops," the final clip worldpremiered on September 21 at the end of German music network VIVA's show Neu. However, it was not added to the network's current playlist until 29 September 2007.

The group has declared the filming of the "mammoth shoot" as "extremely exhausting," referring to its extraordinary length and a delay of several hours, caused by various technical defects. Lucy Diakovska has described the plotless clip as a "white, elegant, melancholic but positive [and ...] very simple video, riddled with many nice details and ideas." Inspired by a concept developed by all four members and based on Sternberg's treatment, the music video was eventually conceived as a stylistic counterpart to "Teardrops."

== Track listings ==
CD single ("Amaze Me" edition)
No.	Title	Writer(s)	Producer(s)	Length
1.	"Amaze Me"	Karen Poole; Steve Mac	Roland Spremberg; Boogieman	3:48
2.	"Teardrops" (Single Version)	Cecil Womack; Linda Womack	Tobias Gustafsson; Vincent Pontare; Michel Zitron	3:13
3.	"Ain't Gonna Look the Other Way"	Tracy Ackerman; Peer Astrom; Anders Bagge	Harry Sommerdahl	3:50
4.	"Amaze Me" (Remix)	Poole; Mac	Spremberg; Boogieman	3:47
5.	"Amaze Me" (Instrumental Version)	Poole; Mac	Spremberg; Boogieman	3:47
6.	"Amaze Me" (Video)			3:50

Digital single
No.	Title	Writer(s)	Producer(s)	Length
1.	"Amaze Me" (Album Version)	Poole; Mac	Spremberg; Boogieman	3:47
2.	"Teardrops" (Single Version)	C. Womack; L. Womack	Gustafsson; Pontare; Zitron	3:13
3.	"Ain't Gonna Look the Other Way"	Ackerman; Astrom; Bagge	Sommerdahl	3:50
4.	"Amaze Me" (Remix)	Poole; Mac	Spremberg; Boogieman	3:47
5.	"Amaze Me" (Instrumental Version)	Poole; Mac	Spremberg; Boogieman	3:47
6.	"Teardrops" (Mozart & Friends Club Mix)	C. Womack; L. Womack	Gustafsson; Pontare; Zitron; J. Worthy^{[a]}; Mark Mozart^{[a]}	3:45
7.	"Teardrops" (Mozart & Friends House Mix)	C. Womack; L. Womack	Gustafsson; Pontare; Zitron; Worthy^{[a]}; Mozart^{[a]}	3:44
8.	"Teardrops" (Mozart & Friends House Mix)	C. Womack; L. Womack	Gustafsson; Pontare; Zitron; Manuel Loyo^{[a]}; Alexander Gernert^{[a]}	5:26

Notes

- ^{^a} denotes additional producer

== Credits and personnel ==
Credits taken from Destiny liner notes.

- Production: Boogieman, Roland Spremberg
- Mixing: Boogieman
- Engineering: Nico Schuette
- Guitar, keyboard, bass: Roland Spremberg
- Mastering: Vincent Sorg
- Recorded at January 2007, Sound Studio N (Cologne, Germany)

== Charts ==
Chart performance for "Amaze Me"
Chart (2007)	Peak position
European Hot 100 Singles (Billboard)	88
Germany (GfK)	25

== Release history ==
Release dates and formats for "Amaze Me"
Region	Date	Format	Label	Ref
Various	19 October 2007	CD single; digital download	Polydor; Universal	
