= Teardrops (Womack & Womack song) =

1988 single by Womack & Womack

Single by Womack & Womack

from the album Conscience
- B-side: "Conscious of My Conscience"
- Released: August 5, 1988
- Genre: Dance; soul
- Length: 5:04 (album version); 3:51 (single mix/video version)
- Label: Island
- Songwriters: Cecil Womack; Linda Womack
- Producers: Chris Blackwell; Cecil Womack; Linda Womack

Womack & Womack singles chronology
"(I Wanna) Make Love to You" (1987)	"Teardrops" (1988)	"Life's Just a Ballgame" (1988)

Music video
- "Teardrops" on YouTube

"Teardrops" is a song by American husband-and-wife duo Womack & Womack, released on August 5, 1988, by Island Records as the first single from their fourth studio album, Conscience (1988). The song was written by Cecil Womack and Linda Womack, while production was helmed by Chris Blackwell. Although the song was not a hit in their native United States, it charted highly in the United Kingdom and several European countries, as well as Australia and New Zealand.

In 1993, Elton John and K.D. Lang covered "Teardrops" for John's album Duets. In 1998, UK garage group Lovestation covered the song, and later, German pop band No Angels and Australian singer Kate Alexa released their own cover versions as singles in 2007 and 2008, respectively. In 2002, Lulu and Elton John covered the song for Lulu's album Together. In 2009, the Sugababes recorded the track for the 50 Years of Island Records compilation. It was also covered by the xx in 2009, on a bonus disc with their debut album xx, as well as by British singer Joss Stone who included the track on her 2012 album The Soul Sessions Vol. 2. In 2011, the song was covered by Cliff Richard and Candi Staton for Richard's Soulicious album and by Roosevelt in 2016.

== Critical reception ==
Upon the release in August 1988, Bill Coleman from Billboard magazine wrote, "From one of this year's finest albums, Conscience, comes this musically refreshing and upbeat offering meriting multiformat exposure. Linda Womack's vocals radiate." In 2023, Billboard ranked the song number 83 in their list of "The 100 Best Pop Songs Never to Hit the Hot 100", adding, "Few late-'80s hits were as relentless in their barrage of hooks as "Teardrops", one of the original crying-on-the-dancefloor classics." Pan-European magazine Music & Media wrote, "You cannot resist this one: a sweet, supple and loosely arranged dance track featuring the wonderful vocals of Linda Womack."

Jerry Smith from Music Week complimented "Teardrops" as a "stylish and svelte soul number that sees Chris Blackwell back in the producer's chair as its irresistible rhythm ensures success." John McCready from NME stated that the song "stalks the same radical soul territory continuing Linda and Cecil's joy and pain public romance." Kevin Rowland from Record Mirror said, "Nice vocal effects and interplay. Heartfelt song, good groove." Michael Hochanadel from Schenectady Gazette felt the "spry dance-floor bounce" of the song "beautifully belies its desperation." In 2024, Swedish national radio Sveriges Radio P3 ranked "Teardrops" among the world's 300 best songs.

== Chart performance ==
"Teardrops" reached number one in Belgium and the Netherlands for three and seven weeks, respectively, as well as peaking at number two in Switzerland, the UK, and West Germany. The song was a top-10 hit also in Austria, Denmark, Finland, France, Ireland, Luxembourg and Spain. In Sweden, it became a top-20 hit, peaking at number 14. Outside Europe, "Teardrops" also charted in Oceania, reaching number one in New Zealand and number two in Australia. In West Asia, it became a top-10 hit in Israel, peaking at number ten on 30 October 1988. It did not chart in the duo's native US.

== Music video ==
In the accompanying music video for "Teardrops", the band members, studio musicians and backing vocalists (Lyn Gerald and Dashiell Rae) are shown singing different parts of the song in a recording studio. Linda Womack wears sunglasses throughout the performance.

== Track listing ==
All tracks written by Cecil Womack and Linda Womack, and produced by Chris Blackwell.

7-inch single
No.	Title	Length
1.	"Teardrops" (7-inch version)	3:51
2.	"Conscious of My Conscience"	4:27

== Charts ==
=== Weekly charts ===
Weekly chart performance for "Teardrops"
Chart (1988)	Peak position
Australia (ARIA)	2
Austria (Ö3 Austria Top 40)	4
Belgium (Ultratop 50 Flanders)	1
Denmark (IFPI)	4
Finland (Suomen virallinen lista)	5
France (SNEP)	4
Ireland (IRMA)	4
Israel (Israeli Singles Chart)	10
Luxembourg (Radio Luxembourg)	3
Netherlands (Dutch Top 40)	1
Netherlands (Single Top 100)	1
New Zealand (Recorded Music NZ)	1
Spain (AFYVE)	5
Sweden (Sverigetopplistan)	14
Switzerland (Schweizer Hitparade)	2
UK Singles (OCC)	3
West Germany (GfK)	2

=== Year-end charts ===
Year-end chart performance for "Teardrops"
Chart (1988)	Position
Belgium (Ultratop 50 Flanders)	4
Netherlands (Dutch Top 40)	4
Netherlands (Single Top 100)	1
UK Singles (OCC)	10

Chart (1989)	Position
Australia (ARIA)	12
West Germany (Media Control)	64

== Certifications ==
Certifications for "Teardrops"
Region	Certification	Certified units/sales
Australia (ARIA)	Gold	35,000^{^}
France (SNEP)	Silver	200,000^{*}
Germany (BVMI)	Gold	250,000^{^}
Netherlands (NVPI)	Platinum	100,000^{^}
New Zealand (RMNZ)	2× Platinum	60,000^{‡}
United Kingdom (BPI)	Platinum	600,000^{‡}
^{*} Sales figures based on certification alone.^{^} Shipments figures based on certification alone.^{‡} Sales+streaming figures based on certification alone.

== Lovestation version ==
"Teardrops"

Single by Lovestation

from the album Soulsation
- Released: July 31, 1998
- Genre: UK garage
- Length: 3:50
- Label: Fresh; Jive
- Songwriters: Cecil Womack; Linda Womack
- Producer: Lovestation

Lovestation singles chronology
"Love Come Rescue Me" (1997)	"Teardrops" (1998)	"Sensuality" (1998)

In 1998, British group Lovestation released a version of "Teardrops" as both a CD single and 12-inch vinyl record. "Teardrops" became the group's biggest hit, reaching number 14 in the United Kingdom. In 2000, a new set of remixes was released, but it did not achieve the same degree of success as the first release, peaking at number 24. The 2000 release consisted of several remixes by producers such as Joey Negro, Eric Kupper and Jamie White.

=== Critical reception ===
Mixmag included "Teardrops" in their list of "40 of the best UK garage tracks released from 1995 to 2005". Capital Xtra included the song in their list of "The Best Old-School Garage Anthems of All Time". Gemtracks included the song in their list of the "top UK garage songs between 1995–2005".

=== Track listings ===
- CD maxi single
1. "Teardrops" (Perky Park radio) – 3:47
2. "Teardrops" (original 7-inch mix) – 4:00
3. "Teardrops" (hip hop mix) – 6:30
4. "Teardrops" (Perky Park Summer Experience mix) – 6:15
5. "Teardrops" (Serious Danger mix) – 7:10
- UK CD single
1. "Teardrops" (Flava mix) - 3:46
2. "Teardrops" (Lovestation classic 12-inch) - 6:33
3. "Teardrops" (Wildcat dub) - 8:22
- UK 12-inch single

A. "Teardrops" (Lovestation classic 12-inch)
B1. "Teardrops" (Flava mix 12-inch)
B2. "Teardrops" (Banana Republic vocal mix)

=== Charts ===
Weekly chart performance of the 1998 version of "Teardrops"
Chart (1998–1999)	Peak position
Australia (ARIA)	40
Germany (GfK)	66
Iceland (Íslenski Listinn Topp 40)	16
Netherlands (Dutch Top 40 Tipparade)	6
Netherlands (Single Top 100)	52
Scotland (Official Charts Company)	33
Switzerland (Schweizer Hitparade)	47
UK Singles (OCC)	14
UK Indie (Official Charts)	1
US Hot Dance Club Play (Billboard)	10

Weekly chart performance of the 2000 version of "Teardrops"
Chart (2000)	Peak position
UK Singles (OCC)	24
UK Dance (Official Charts)	8

=== Certifications ===
Certifications for "Teardrops"
Region	Certification	Certified units/sales
United Kingdom (BPI)	Silver	200,000^{‡}
^{‡} Sales+streaming figures based on certification alone.

== No Angels version ==
"Teardrops"

Single by No Angels

from the album Destiny Reloaded
- Released: October 19, 2007
- Length: 3:08
- Label: Polydor; Universal
- Songwriters: Cecil Womack; Linda Womack
- Producers: Tobias Gustafsson; Vincent Pontare; Michel Zitron

No Angels singles chronology
"Maybe" (2007)	"Teardrops" / "Amaze Me" (2007)	"Disappear" (2008)

In June 2007, all-female German pop group No Angels recorded an uptempo version of "Teardrops". While the ballad "Amaze Me" was initially planned to be released as the third single from their fourth studio album, Destiny (2007), Universal Records persuaded the band to record additional material for a double A-single consisting of "Amaze Me" and "Teardrops." Production on the Womack & Womack cover was overseen by Swedish musicians Tobias Gustafsson, Vincent Pontare, and Michel Zitron. Built upon a synth-heavy, beat driven instrumentation, their version omits the opening verse's second line "I break down and cry, next time I'll be true, yeah."

=== Release and reception ===
"Teardrops" was first previewed on RTL's news programme Punkt 6 on August 22, 2007, and by August 27, 2007, a thirty-seconds clip of the song had leaked onto the internet – the same week "Teardrops" was serviced to radio stations. No Angels premiered the song on the television live show ZDF Fernsehgarten on September 9, 2007. Physical and digital singles were released on October 19, 2007, including remixes by Roland Spremberg, Boogieman, and Mozart & Friends as well as the previously unreleased track "Ain't Gonna Look the Other Way", a re-recording of the 2004 Tracy Ackerman-penned song by Canadian singer Celine Dion. On November 2, 2007, "Amaze Me"/"Teardrops" debuted and peaked at number 25 on the German Singles Chart, the band's second-lowest peak by then.

=== Music video ===
The music video for "Teardrops" was directed by Marcus Sternberg and shot in a filming studio between August 20–22, 2007, in Berlin, Germany. Shot over twenty hours back-to-back with the video for "Amaze Me", the edited clip premiered on September 29, 2007, on the Universal Music Group website. The clip received its first official airing in the week of September 29, 2007, on German music network iMusic1.

The group has declared the filming of the "mammoth shoot" as "extremely exhausting," referring to its extraordinary length and a delay of several hours, caused by various technical defects. Lucy Diakovska has described the plotless clip as a "funky disco-dance-energy-video," reflecting another facet of the band in music and style. Inspired by a concept developed by all four members and based on Sternberg's treatment, the music video was conceived as a stylistic counterpart to "Amaze Me".

=== Track listings ===
CD single ("Teardrops" edition)
No.	Title	Writer(s)	Producer(s)	Length
1.	"Amaze Me"	Karen Poole; Steve Mac	Roland Spremberg; Boogieman	3:48
2.	"Teardrops" (Single Version)	Cecil Womack; Linda Womack	Tobias Gustafsson; Vincent Pontare; Michel Zitron	3:13
3.	"Teardrops" (Mozart & Friends Club Mix)	C. Womack; L. Womack	Gustafsson; Pontare; Zitron; J. Worthy^{[a]}; Mark Mozart^{[a]}	3:45
4.	"Teardrops" (Mozart & Friends House Mix)	C. Womack; L. Womack	Gustafsson; Pontare; Zitron; Worthy^{[a]}; Mozart^{[a]}	3:44
5.	"Teardrops" (Mozart & Friends House Mix)	C. Womack; L. Womack	Gustafsson; Pontare; Zitron; Manuel Loyo^{[a]}; Alexander Gernert^{[a]}	5:26
6.	"Teardrops" (Video)			3:13

Digital single
No.	Title	Writer(s)	Producer(s)	Length
1.	"Amaze Me" (Album Version)	Poole; Mac	Spremberg; Boogieman	3:47
2.	"Teardrops" (Single Version)	C. Womack; L. Womack	Gustafsson; Pontare; Zitron	3:13
3.	"Ain't Gonna Look the Other Way"	Tracy Ackerman; Peer Astrom; Anders Bagge	Harry Sommerdahl	3:50
4.	"Amaze Me" (Remix)	Poole; Mac	Spremberg; Boogieman	3:47
5.	"Amaze Me" (Instrumental Version)	Poole; Mac	Spremberg; Boogieman	3:47
6.	"Teardrops" (Mozart & Friends Club Mix)	C. Womack; L. Womack	Gustafsson; Pontare; Zitron; Worthy^{[a]}; Mozart^{[a]}	3:45
7.	"Teardrops" (Mozart & Friends House Mix)	C. Womack; L. Womack	Gustafsson; Pontare; Zitron; Worthy^{[a]}; Mozart^{[a]}	3:44
8.	"Teardrops" (Mozart & Friends House Mix)	C. Womack; L. Womack	Gustafsson; Pontare; Zitron; Loyo^{[a]}; Gernert^{[a]}	5:26

Notes

- ^{^a} denotes additional producer

=== Credits and personnel ===
Credits taken from Destiny Reloaded liner notes.

- Nadja Benaissa – lead vocalist
- Lucy Diakovska – lead vocalist
- Tobias Gustafsson – producer
- Joachim "Jeo" Mezei – mixing engineer
- Sandy Mölling – lead vocalist
- Vincent Pontare – producer
- Jessica Wahls – lead vocalist
- Cecil Womack – writer
- Linda Womack – writer
- Michel Zitron – producer

=== Charts ===
Weekly chart performance for "Teardrops"
Chart (2007)	Peak position
Germany (GfK)	25

=== Release history ===
Release dates and formats for "Teardrops"
Region	Date	Format	Label	Ref
Various	October 19, 2007	CD single; digital download	Polydor; Universal	

== Kate Alexa version ==
"Teardrops"

Single by Kate Alexa featuring Baby Bash
- B-side: "It's Alright"
- Released: March 3, 2008
- Length: 4:16
- Label: Liberation
- Songwriters: Cecil Womack; Linda Womack
- Producer: Molly Meldrum

Kate Alexa singles chronology
"Better than You" (2006)	"Teardrops" (2008)	"Infatuation" (2011)

Baby Bash singles chronology
"What Is It" (2008)	"Teardrops" (2008)	"Don't Stop" (2008)

In early 2008, Australian singer Kate Alexa covered the song for her second studio album. It was produced by Molly Meldrum and features American rapper Baby Bash. It was released as the album's first single in Australia on March 3, 2008, as a CD single and digital download. Alexa stated that she was always a massive fan of the song, originally released the same year she was born. The song was released to Australian radio on February 1, 2008, and peaked at number 64 on the airplay chart.

The song's producer, Molly Meldrum, suggested that Alexa should cover the song. Alexa states "I was looking to do a single between albums, and Molly came up with the idea of doing 'Teardrops'. At first, I was a little sceptical because the original is such a classic and I love it so much. But then Molly and I spoke about how we could do it." American rapper Baby Bash heard what Alexa was doing with the song through a friend of Alexa's manager and decided to take part in the song. Alexa states "He's a very cool guy. He came in and did the rap in one take, and it fitted perfectly. It's got such an incredible feel and groove and we wanted to keep that vibe. But we also wanted to do something different, and the rap takes the track to a whole new place."

The song debuted on the Australian ARIA Singles Chart in early March 2008 at number 28. It went to peak at number 26 the following week. It also charted at number seven on the Physical Singles chart and number eight on the Australian Artists Chart. "Teardrops" spent six weeks on the chart, five of which were in the top fifty. The music video for the song was filmed on January 14, 2008, at the Love Machine in South Yarra, Melbourne, Australia.

=== Track listing ===
CD / digital single
No.	Title	Writer(s)	Producer(s)	Length
1.	"Teardrops" (Meldrum Radio Edit, featuring Baby Bash)	Cecil Womack; Linda Womack	Molly Meldrum	3:17
2.	"Teardrops" (Album Edit, featuring Baby Bash)	C. Womack; L. Womack	Reed Vertelney	4:16
3.	"It's Alright" (Mozart & Friends Club Mix)	Kate Alexa; Anthony Egizii; David Musumeci	Egizii; Musumeci	3:35
4.	"It's Alright" (Karaoke Version)	Alexa; Egizii; Musumeci	Egizii; Musumeci	3:36

=== Charts ===
Weekly chart performance for "Teardrops"
Chart (2008)	Peak position
Australia (ARIA)	26

== Other versions ==
- On June 1, 2009, English girl group Sugababes' record label Island Records released the album Island Life – 50 Years of Island Records for which the Sugababes covered the track "Teardrops". The song debuted on the Romanian Top 100 at number 63 and charted 3 weeks later at number 40.
- A 2018 cover by Neil Frances was awarded Gold certification by the Australian Recording Industry Association (ARIA) in 2024.
- Australian singer Guy Sebastian released a cover of the song on YouTube in January 2025.
