= Reste Encore =

Single by L5

from the album Retiens-Moi
- Released: 4 November 2003
- Studio: ICP Recording Studios, Brussels
- Genre: Pop; R&B; adult contemporary
- Length: 3:40
- Label: Mercury
- Songwriters: Christina Rumbley; Peter Ibsen; Sacha Skarbek; Noun
- Producers: Fred Fraikin; Djoum

L5 singles chronology
"Maniac" (2003)	"Reste Encore" (2003)	"Déconnecter" (2005)

"Reste Encore" (French for: Keep Staying) is a song by French recording band L5. Initially written by Christina Rumbley, Peter Ibsen, and Sacha Skarbek with English lyrics, it was adapted by Noun and produced by Fred Fraikin and Djoum for the group's second studio album Retiens-Moi (2002). The sensual piano ballad was released as the album's fourth and final single in November 2003 and reached number 56 on the French Singles Chart, becoming the band's lowest-charting single. In 2007, fellow Popstars winners No Angels recorded the original song, entitled "Make a Change", for their fourth studio album Destiny (2007).

== Charts ==
Chart (2003)	Peak position
France (SNEP)	56

== Release history ==
Region	Date	Label	Format
France	4 November 2003	Mercury	Digital download, CD single
