= Goodbye to Yesterday (No Angels song) =

Single by No Angels

from the album Destiny
- Released: 16 March 2007
- Recorded: January 2007
- Studio: Sound Studio N (Cologne, Germany)
- Length: 3:30
- Label: Polydor; Universal
- Songwriters: Pelle Ankarberg; David Jassy; Niclas Molinder; Joacim Persson
- Producer: Twin

No Angels singles chronology
"Reason" (2003)	"Goodbye to Yesterday" (2007)	"Maybe" (2007)

"Goodbye to Yesterday" is a song by all-female German pop group No Angels. It was written by Pelle Ankarberg, Joacim Persson, Niclas Molinder, and David Jassy and produced by Swedish production team Twin for the band's comeback record, their fourth studio album Destiny (2007). No Angels' first release after a three-year hiatus, the song also marked their first commercial release to feature the group's second lineup, which excluded original band member Vanessa Petruo. Musically, "Goodbye to Yesterday" is a piano-led pop ballad with elements of pop rock; the song's lyrics are about the breakdown of a relationship which the female protagonist refuses to start all over again.

The song was released by Polydor and Universal Domestic Pop as the album's first single in March 2007 and debuted and peaked at number four on the German Singles Chart. It also entered the top twenty in Switzerland and on a composite Eurochart Hot 100 Singles chart, as well as the top thirty of the Austrian Singles Chart, resulting in a total of 30,000 sold copies. "Goodbye to Yesterday" was promoted on several television and award shows such as the 2007 Echo Awards, TV Total, and The Dome and later included in the set lists of their 2010 An Intimate Evening with No Angels tour and their 2022 Celebration Tour.

== Background ==
In mid-2006, No Angels member Lucy Diakovska approached her former bandmates to arrange a first meeting with all original band members for years following their disbandment in December 2003. While Vanessa Petruo refused to re-join the band in favour of an independent solo career in music and film, all other members of the original line-up agreed upon Diakovska's request to reunite for a musical comeback, and the band eventually took action to prepare their next album in secrecy from public.

Requested by No Angels' A&R manager Niklas Hafemann, "Goodbye to Yesterday" was composed specifically for their comeback album Destiny, It was written Swedish musicians and longtime contributors David Jassy, Pelle Ankarberg, Niclas Molinder, and Joacim Persson, while production and arrangement was handled by the latter two under their production pseudonyme Twin. Ankarberg played the piano and the strings, while Persson, Niko Valsamidis, and Klas Olofsson were on the guitars. Bass were arranged by Niclas Bosson. Boogieman mixed the track, with Tobias Eichelberg assisting in the audio engineering. Vocals were recorded at Sound Studio N in Cologne, Germany in late January 2007.

Fully completed and conveyed shortly prior to recording start early 2007, "Goodbye to Yesterday" was an eleventh-hour addition to the album's recording listing and the last song out of eight proposed tracks to be recorded by the group, with most of it being recorded spontaneously due to timing conflicts. The band has described the song as an example of their musical and lyrical development and personal maturity during the years of their break: "It typifies everything we have to say," Lucy Diakovska said in an interview with NRJ Radio Energy. "It's not about bidding farewell to something, but about flipping a new chapter open and [...] putting experiences into practice." However, Sandy Mölling noted that the song and its title "may not be appreciated as a motto," since the band felt no regret of their acts and decisions in the past.

== Release and reception ==
"Goodbye to Yesterday" was eventually selected as the album's lead single out of a total of seven songs. Although the full track was given its first ever radio airplay at midnight on 1 February 2007, following the official announcement of the band reunion, a twenty-second clip of "Goodbye to Yesterday" was previewed on RTL network's news programme Punkt 12 during a press conference the day before. By 2 February the entire track had been ripped from radio, and leaked onto the internet. Officially released on 16 March 2007 in all German-speaking countries, the CD, two-track and the digital single spawned dance, electronic and house music-influenced remixes by producers and DJs such as DJ Klaas, Milan East, Redfly, Roland Spremberg, and Stephan Gade.

Released at midnight of 1 February 2007 to European radio stations, "Goodbye to Yesterday" debuted at number 22 on the German Airplay Chart only three days after its release. It eventually reached its peak position of number 14 in its second week, but remained another ten weeks within the top 30 of that particular chart, according to Nielsen Music Control. Following its physical release on 16 March 2007 in German-speaking Europe, the single debuted at number 4 on the German Singles Chart based on composite digital singles and CD singles sales, becoming No Angels' highest-charting single since 2003's "Feelgood Lies." However, as the song failed to climb any higher during its nine-week chart run, it also became the band's first leading single not to reach the top position on the German Media Control Chart. Altogether, "Goodbye to Yesterday" sold more than 30,000 copies domestically.

In Switzerland, the single opened and peaked at number 16 on the Swiss Singles Chart, where it became the group's highest-charting single since 2002's "Still in Love with You." It remained eight weeks on the chart and eventually emerged as the album's best-selling single there. By contrast, "Goodbye to Yesterday" became No Angels' lowest-charting single since 2002's "All Cried Out" in Austria. It debuted at number 21 on the Ö3 Austria Top 40 and fell out of the top 100 in its seventh week, also becoming the band's shortest-running single until then. In addition, the track peaked at number 19 on a composite Eurochart Hot 100 Singles chart.

== Music video ==
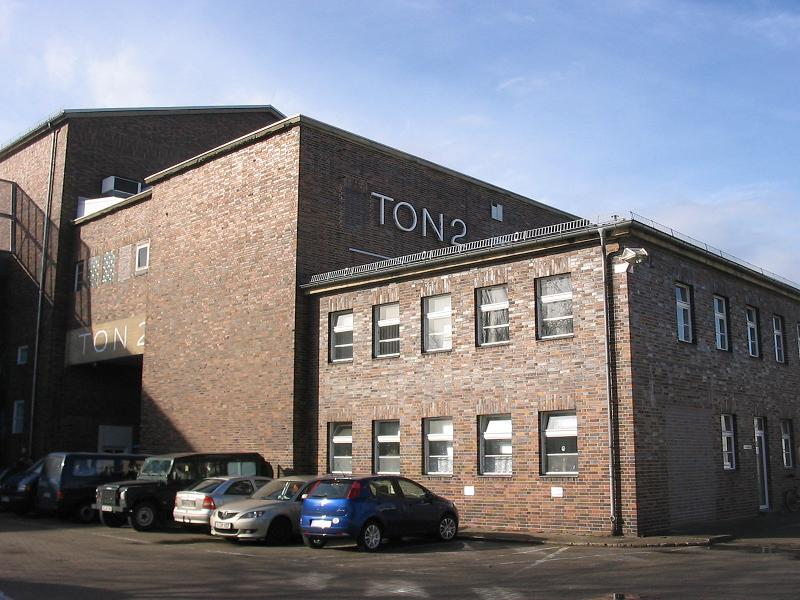
The music video for "Goodbye to Yesterday" was filmed at the Union Studios in Berlin-Tempelhof (pictured).

The music video for "Goodbye to Yesterday" saw the band reuniting with German director Marcus Sternberg, with whom the band had previously collaborated on five clips between the years of 2002 and 2003, including their ECHO Award-winning video for "Something about Us." Entirely filmed on-stage at the Berlin Union Studios in Berlin-Tempelhof, Germany on 9 February 2007, it was shot over seventeen hours, involving choreography by former Fame Academy judge, Mölling's former spouse Renick Bernadina. As reported, the four band members bore the production costs of an estimated €90,000 partly by themselves as their record company Universal Music Domestic considered the shoot too high in price to incur additional expenses.

The video does not have a substantial plot but incorporates the idea of a behind the scenes documentary film look, involving outtakes and making-of shots. It primarily focuses on each of the girls performing their verses on one of the four main sets; with Nadja Benaissa sitting at a pier, Jessica Wahls standing in the rain in front of a bar, Sandy Mölling performing in an artificial snow flurry, and Diakovska dancing on a chimney-pocked rooftop. A one and a half minutes preview of the edited music video was aired on 22 February 2007 on German television channel ProSieben at 8.13 PM. The full version was eventually premiered on 23 February at the end of VIVA's show Neu. A making-of-clip of the video was released on a digital video disc on the album's re-release edition, Destiny Reloaded (2008).

== Track listings ==
All tracks written by Pelle Ankarberg, David Jassy, Niclas Molinder, and Joacim Persson.

CD maxi single
No.	Title	Producer(s)	Length
1.	"Goodbye to Yesterday" (Radio Edit)	Twin	3:29
2.	"Goodbye to Yesterday" (Milan East Remix)	Twin; Milan East^{[a]}	5:14
3.	"Goodbye to Yesterday" (Klaas Remix Short Cut)	Twin; Klaas Gerung^{[a]}	4:19
4.	"Goodbye to Yesterday" (Black Dog Remix)	Twin; Roland Spremberg^{[a]}; Stephan Gade^{[a]}	3:49
5.	"Goodbye to Yesterday" (Instrumental)	Twin	3:29

2-track CD single
No.	Title	Producer(s)	Length
1.	"Goodbye to Yesterday" (Radio Edit)	Twin	3:29
2.	"Goodbye to Yesterday" (Black Dog Remix)	Brötzmann; Jeo^{[a]}	3:49

Digital download
No.	Title	Producer(s)	Length
1.	"Goodbye to Yesterday" (Redfly Remix)	Twin	3:30

Notes

- ^{^a} denotes additional producer

== Credits and personnel ==
Credits taken from Destiny liner notes.

- Production: Twin
- Mixing: Boogieman
- Engineering: Tobias Eichelberg
- Arrangement: Twin
- Backing vocals arrangement: Pelle Ankarberg
- Bass: Niclas Bosson
- Guitar: Joacim Persson, Niko Valsamidis, Klas Olofsson
- Piano: Pelle Ankarberg
- Strings: Pelle Ankarberg
- Mastering: Vincent Sorg

== Charts ==
=== Weekly charts ===
Weekly chart performance for "Goodbye to Yesterday"
Chart (2007)	Peak position
Austria (Ö3 Austria Top 40)	21
Europe (Eurochart Hot 100)	19
Europe (European Airplay Chart)	58
Germany (GfK)	4
Germany (Official Airplay Chart)	14
Switzerland (Schweizer Hitparade)	16

=== Year-end charts ===
Year-end chart performance for "Goodbye to Yesterday"
Chart (2007)	Position
Germany (Official German Charts)	97

== Release history ==
Release dates and formats for "Goodbye to Yesterday"
Region	Date	Format	Label	Ref
Various	16 March 2007	CD single; digital download	Polydor; Universal	
