= Joacim Persson =

Swedish songwriter, producer, music publisher

- Born: Joacim Bo Persson; April 17, 1971 (age 55); Örebro, Sweden
- Genres: Pop; R&B; Rock; Nu metal (In Waving Corn); Thrash metal (In Fallen Angel)
- Occupations: Songwriter, Producer, Remixer, Entrepreneur. Founder of Auddly (non executive)
- Years active: 1995–present
- Website: auddly.com

Joacim Bo Persson (born April 17, 1971) is a Swedish songwriter, producer, music publisher, entrepreneur and one of the founders of Auddly, a venture between Niclas Molinder, Max Martin and Björn Ulvaeus (ABBA). With Molinder, he is also part of the writing-producing team Twin. Joacim Persson has been writing and producing songs for platinum-selling artists such as Kelly Clarkson, John Legend, Kylie Minogue, Lady Gaga, Jonas Brothers, Tokio Hotel, Mary J. Blige, Willow Smith, Iyaz, Miley Cyrus, Selena Gomez, Armin van Buuren, Charice, Ashley Tisdale, Robyn and Jamiroquai.

Persson had been working with Sebastian Arman since 2017. Their collaboration, called Decco, has produced such songs as Sun Comes Out (with Leo Stannard) and Crazy to Love You (with Alex Clare).

== Career ==
Persson was born and raised in Örebro, Sweden. He started out as a guitarist in a local rock band called Fallen Angel. The band signed a deal to German record label Massacre records when Persson was 18, releasing their first album titled Faith Fails. At age twenty-two, Persson formed his second band, Waving Corn, the band signed to Roadrunner Records in Holland. After the release of their album Tearsurf the band decided to split up after three years of intense touring over Europe. During the recording of Tearsurf, Persson met engineer Niclas Molinder at the studio Eagle One, and together they formed a new production team called Twin.

=== Twin ===
In the beginning Persson and Molinder focused on club remixes and quickly scored a No. 1 dance hit with "La Fiesta" in The Netherlands. The duo then kept delivering remixes for artists such as Jamiroquai, Jennifer Brown, Robyn, Sophie Ellis-Bextor, Kylie Minogue. TWIN later signed a deal with Zomba Jive as a DJ/producer. As part of this agreement, they released the successful singles "A New Day" and "Electrified Love".

"Twin" production and writing credits Mary J. Blige, Miley Cyrus, Lady Gaga, Kylie Minogue, Jonas Brothers, Jamiroquai, Iyaz, Zendaya, Robyn, Armin van Buuren, Tokio Hotel, Selena Gomez, Willow Smith, Bridgit Mendler, Ashley Tisdale, Marlon Roudette, S Club 7, The Cheetah Girls, Sophie Ellis-Bextor, Aura Dione, Adel Tawil, 2raumwohnung, Holly Valance, Gloria Gaynor, Snap!, Tynisha Keli, Charice, Marlon Roudette, Camp Rock 2: The Final Jam, Amber, China Anne McClain, Girlicious, Starstruck, Belinda, V Factory, No Angels, Samantha Mumba, Heidi Montag, Agnes. Darin, Mandy Capristo, Play, Austin & Ally, Lemonade Mouth, Javine, Bratz, Paulina Rubio, and Preluders among many others.

=== Songwriting ===
Perssons songwriting collaborations include names such as David Foster, Ryan Tedder, Kara DioGuardi, etc. Persson has been rewarded with more than 40 Gold and Platinum records

=== Entrepreneur ===
In 2012 Persson founded Auddly, a company founded and co-owned by Joacim Persson, Niclas Molinder, Max Martin, Ash Pournouri and Björn Ulvaeus from Abba. Auddly is a web-based music service set to be launched in 2015.

== Discography ==
- "Run, Run, Run" Kelly Clarkson feat John Legend
- "Shatter'd" Tynisha Keli
- "The Heart Get No Sleep" Tokio Hotel
- "Feel It All" Tokio Hotel
- "LA Baby" Jonas Brothers
- "Critical" Jonas Brothers
- "Hey You" Jonas Brothers
- "Things Will Never Be The Same" Jonas Brothers
- "Keep It Undercover" Zendaya
- "Come Along" Marlon Roudette
- "Hearts Pull" Marlon Roudette
- "Can't Fight Love Away" Armin van Buuren
- "Pyramid" Charice Feat Iyaz
- "I Did It For You" Charice
- "Everything Is Not What It Seems" Selena Gomez
- "We Gonna Get This feat Iyaz" Hanna Montana
- "Kiss It Goodbye" Hanna Montana
- "21 st Century Girl" Willow Smith
- "Geronimo" Aura Dione
- "What It's Like" Aura Dione
- "In Love with the World" Aura Dione
- "It's Alright It's OK" Ashley Tisdale
- "Be Good To Me" Ashley Tisdale
- "Not Like That" Ashley Tisdale
- "Goin Crazy" Ashley Tisdale
- "Crank It Up" Ashley Tisdale
- "What If" Ashley Tisdale
- "Overrated" Ashley Tisdale
- "Acting Out" Ashley Tisdale
- "Erase And Rewind" Ashley Tisdale
- "Heroes" Conchita Wurst
- "Definition Of A Man" Javine
- "When You're Near " SNAP
- "Torn Up" Cody Simpson
- "We Can Change The World" Bridget Mendler
- "Lo Siento" Belinda
- "Walking In My Shoes" Camp Rock
- "Wenn Du Liebst" Adel Tawil
- "Calling All The Monsters" China McClain
- "How Did I Get From Here To There" China McClain
- "Make Your Mark" China McClain
- "Unstoppable" China McClain
- One In A Million Isac Elliot
- Just cant Let Her Go Isac Eliot
- "Sexual Lover" Paulina Rubio
- "Wish Upon A Star" Samantha Mumba
- "The Way I Like It" Mandy Capristo
- "Over It" Tiffany Affair
- "Sundown" S club 8
- "Gotta Be Forever" Gloria Gaynor
- "Gone To Long" Gloria Gaynor
- "I Never Knew" Gloria Gaynor
- "All The Man I Need" Gloria Gaynor
- "Love Struck" V Factory
- "In It For The Love" V Factory
- "History" V Factory
- "Pump It" V Factory
- "Lights Camera Action" V Factory
- "Honey Bunny" Dr Alban
- "Raggamuffin Girl" Dr Alban
- "Body Language" Heidi Montage
- "Wenn Du Liebst" Adel Tawil
- "Heroes" Elena Paparizou
- "Sex Without Sex" Amber
- "Chasing The Beat Of My Heart" Austin & Ally
- "Timeless" Austin & Ally
- "No Angles Pure"
- "Feelgood Lies" No Angels
- "Eleven Out Of Ten" No Angels
- "Goodbye To Yesterday" No Angels
- "Maybe" No Angels
- "Back Off" No Angels
- "Unnatural Blonde" Sandy
- "Tell Me" Sandy
- "Say It Again" Sandy
- "Sorry You've Got The Wrong Girl" Sandy
- "Do It All Over" Sandy
- "All Eyes On You" Sandy
- "Speed Of Love" Sandy
- "Determinate" Lemonade Mouth
- "Breakthrough" Lemonade Mouth
- "What If" Darin
- "Road Trip" Darin
- "Bei Dir Bin Ich Schön" 2Raum Wohnung
- "Ein Neues Gefühl" 2Raum Wohnung
- Shake It Up 1
- Shake It Up 2
- Shake It Up 3
- "Sundown" Preluders
- "Wango Tango" IYK
- "Poor Millionaire" IYK
- "Jingo Ba" IYK
- "Higher" Erik Grönwall
- "Mi Amore" Velvet
- "Deja Vu" Velvet
- "Wonder Where You Are" Da Buzz
- "Keep On Lovin Me" Da Buzz
- "Me Gusta" Mikolas Josef

Production and remix credits

- "No More Drama" Mary J Blige
- "Love At First Sight" Kylie Minogue
- "Love Fool" Jamiroquai
- "Marry The Night" Lady Gaga
- "Murder On The Dancefloor" Sophie Ellis-Bextor
- "Dont Stop The Music" Robyn
- "Keep The Fire Burning" Robyn
- "Down boy" Holly Valance
- "Sexual Lover" Paulina Rubio
- "In My Garden"Jennifer Brown
- "Coming Home" Tityo
- "When To Hold On" Jennifer Brown

=== With Waving Corn ===
- 1995 - Tearsurf
- 1995 - Doin it (EP)

=== With Fallen Angel ===
- 1988 - Demo 1
- 1989 - Hang-Over
- 1990 - Appendix / Nirvana 2002 / Authorize / Fallen Angel (Split)
- 1991 - Fallen Angel
- 1992 - Faith Fails
