= Niclas Molinder =

Swedish songwriter, producer, music publisher and engineer

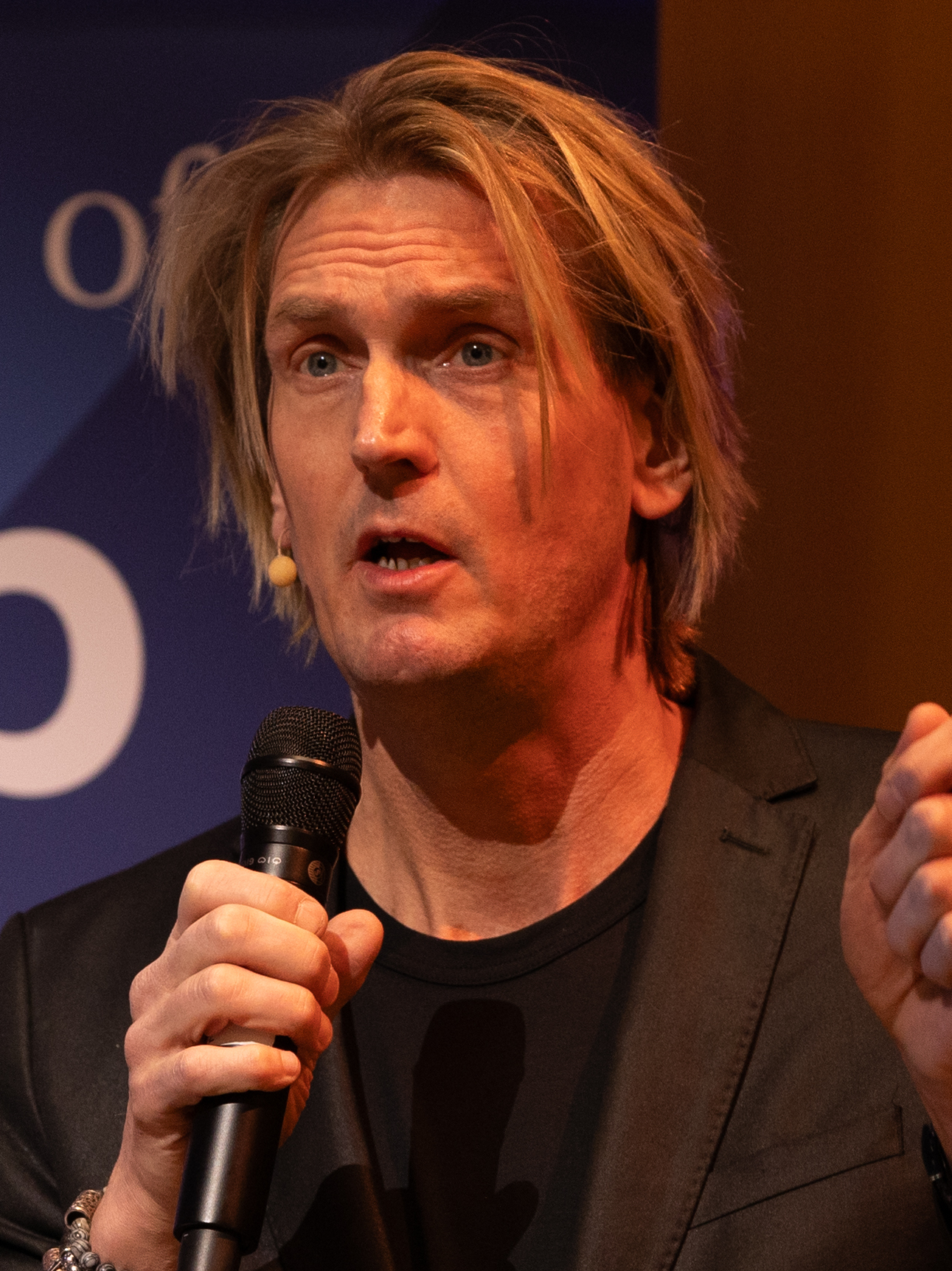
- Molinder in 2023
- Born: Niclas Aake Molinder; 17 March 1970 (age 55); Öland, Sweden
- Occupation: Songwriter

Niclas Aake Molinder is a Swedish songwriter, producer, music publisher and engineer. He is one of the founders of Auddly, a venture between Niclas Molinder, Joacim Persson, Max Martin and Björn Ulvaeus from ABBA. He also co-founded the startup Session with Björn Ulvaeus and Max Martin.

Niclas Molinder appears at conferences and festivals as a speaker and panelist advocating for music rights of creators. On such topics, he is one of the leaders of the educative initiative called Creators Learn Intellectual Property (CLIP), owned and managed by WIPO for Creators a project of the World Intellectual Property Organization.

== Music Rights Awareness Foundation ==
In 2016, Niclas Molinder, Max Martin, and Björn Ulvaeus founded the "Music Rights Awareness Foundation". This political foundation aims to increase knowledge of music rights worldwide, through education and support, and to help music creators to take control of their rights and be able to live on their music – regardless of economical, geographical and cultural conditions.

=== WIPO for Creators ===
The World Intellectual Property Organization (WIPO) and the Music Rights Awareness Foundation (MRAF) have established a consortium, WIPO for Creators, to promote awareness of intellectual property (IP) rights and support creators in securing recognition and fair remuneration for their work. The initiative was launched through an agreement signed by WIPO Director General Francis Gurry and MRAF co-founders Björn Ulvaeus, Niclas Molinder, and Max Martin; it seeks to engage public and private stakeholders in global education and support programs. Emphasizing the importance of effective copyright systems, especially amid the COVID-19 crisis and the growing complexity of the digital marketplace, the consortium aims to strengthen creators’ understanding of IP rights and data management to ensure proper compensation and credit for their contributions. Bjorn Ulvaeus, shared a video explaining how knowledge of IP rights is key to a successful music career.
