= The Primitives discography =

- Studio albums: 5
- EPs: 7
- Compilation albums: 7
- Singles: 22
- Box sets: 1

This is the discography of English indie pop band the Primitives.

== Albums ==
=== Studio albums ===
Title	Album details	Peak chart positions							Certifications
Title	Album details	UK	CAN	FIN	GER	NZ	SWE	US	Certifications
Lovely	Released: 28 March 1988; Label: RCA; Formats: CD, LP, MC	6	85	28	62	26	20	106	UK: Gold
Pure	Released: 16 October 1989; Label: RCA; Formats: CD, LP, MC	33	—	—	—	—	—	113	
Galore	Released: January 1992; Label: RCA; Formats: CD, LP, MC	—	—	—	—	—	—	—	
Echoes and Rhymes	Released: 23 April 2012; Label: Elefant; Formats: CD, LP, digital download	—	—	—	—	—	—	—	
Spin-O-Rama	Released: 13 October 2014; Label: Elefant; Formats: CD, LP, digital download	—	—	—	—	—	—	—	
"—" denotes releases that did not chart or were not released in that territory.

=== Compilation albums ===
Title	Album details	Peak chart positions	
Title	Album details	UK	UK Indie
Lazy 86–88	Released: 21 August 1989; Label: Lazy; Formats: CD, LP, MC	73	1
Bombshell – The Hits & More	Released: 1994; Label: RCA; Formats: CD	—	—
Best of the Primitives	Released: June 1996; Label: Camden; Formats: CD; Reissued by Sony BMG in July 2005	—	—
Bubbling Up	Released: August 1998; Label: NMC; Formats: CD; Reissued by Neptune Music in 2001 as Buzz, Buzz, Buzz	—	—
Thru the Flowers – The Anthology	Released: 13 September 2004; Label: Castle Music; Formats: 2xCD	—	—
Buzz Buzz Buzz – The Complete Lazy Recordings	Released: 12 June 2006; Label: Castle Music; Formats: 2xCD	—	—
Everything's Shining Bright – The Lazy Recordings 1985–1987	Released: 25 March 2013; Label: Cherry Red; Formats: 2xCD, digital download; Also released digitally as two separate albums: The Lazy Singles and The Lazy Album Sessions	—	—
"—" denotes releases that did not chart or were not released in that territory.

=== Box sets ===
Title	Album details
Bloom! The Full Story 1985–1992	Released: 20 March 2020; Label: Cherry Red; Formats: 5xCD

== EPs ==
Title	Album details
Crash	Released: March 1988; Label: RCA; Formats: 7"
Out of Reach	Released: April 1988; Label: RCA; Formats: 7"
Secrets	Released: September 1989; Label: RCA; Formats: CD, 7"
Spells	Released: 28 October 1991; Label: RCA; Formats: CD, 12"
Never Kill a Secret EP	Released: 7 March 2011; Label: Fortuna Pop!; Formats: CD, 7", digital download
New Thrills	Released: 5 May 2015; Label: Elefant; Formats: CD, 10", digital download
Five Fluffy Favourites • Part Time Punks Session	Released: June 2018; Label: Self-released; Formats: CD

== Singles ==
Title	Year	Peak chart positions								Album
Title	Year	UK	UK Indie	AUS	GER	IRE	NZ	SWE	US Alt	Album
"Thru the Flowers"	1986	—	20	—	—	—	—	—	—	Non-album singles
"Really Stupid"	1986	—	3	—	—	—	—	—	—	Non-album singles
"Stop Killing Me"	1987	78	2	—	—	—	—	—	—	Lovely
"Ocean Blue" (limited release)	1987	—	—	—	—	—	—	—	—	Lovely
"Thru the Flowers" (new version)	1987	77	3	—	—	—	—	—	—	Lovely
"Crash"	1988	5	—	—	42	3	11	2	3	Lovely
"Out of Reach"	1988	25	—	—	—	13	—	—	—	Lovely
"Way Behind Me"	1988	36	—	91	—	30	—	—	8	Pure
"Sick of It"	1989	24	—	—	—	—	—	—	9	Pure
"Secrets"	1989	49	—	—	—	—	—	—	12	Pure
"All the Way Down" (US promo-only release)	1990	—	—	—	—	—	—	—	—	Pure
"You Are the Way"	1991	58	—	169	—	—	—	—	—	Galore
"Earth Thing" (Note: Title on the cover is 'Spells', which is the name of an EP that includes "Earth Thing" and its B-side "Emphasise".)	1991	81	—	—	—	—	—	—	—	Galore
"Lead Me Astray"	1992	85	—	—	—	—	—	—	—	Galore
"Crash" ('95 mix; US promo-only release)	1995	—	—	—	—	—	—	—	33	Dumb and Dumber: Original Motion Picture Soundtrack
"The Witch"	2011	—	—	—	—	—	—	—	—	Echoes and Rhymes
"Turn Off the Moon"	2012	—	—	—	—	—	—	—	—	Echoes and Rhymes
"Lose the Reason"	2013	—	—	—	—	—	—	—	—	Spin-O-Rama
"Spin-O-Rama"	2014	—	—	—	—	—	—	—	—	Spin-O-Rama
"Purifying Tone" (Modular remix) (Note: Title on the cover is 'The Primitives Reworked by Modular'; consists of a remix of "Purifying Tone" and the B-side "Lose the Reason" by Spanish band Modular.)	2015	—	—	—	—	—	—	—	—	Non-album singles
"Stop Killing Me" (Part Time Punks Radio Session; Japan-only limited release) (Note: Title on the cover is 'Lovely 30th Anniversary Japan Tour'; consists of a radio session version of "Stop Killing Me" and an early version of "Rattle My Cage", and was exclusively available at shows in Tokyo.)	2019	—	—	—	—	—	—	—	—	Non-album singles
"Don't Know Where To Start"	2023	—	—	—	—	—	—	—	—	Non-album singles
"—" denotes releases that did not chart or were not released in that territory.
