= Bengü discography =

- Studio albums: 8
- Singles: 7

This is the discography of Turkish pop singer Bengü, who has released eight studio albums, six maxi singles and numerous singles. She is one of the best-selling female artists in Turkey.

== Albums ==
=== Studio albums ===
Year	Album	Album	Certifications	Sales
2000	Hoş Geldin (Welcome)	Released: 6 July 2000: Format: Cassette, CD, digital download; Label: Kiss Müzik		
2005	Bağlasan Durmam (I Won't Stay Even If You Bind Me)	Released: 23 June 2005: Format: Cassette, CD, digital download; Label: DSM		52,000
2007	Taktik (Tactic)	Released: 12 June 2007: Format: Cassette, CD, digital download; Label: Erol Köse	Mü-yap: Digital	60,000
2008	Gezegen (Planet)	Released: 1 July 2008: Format: Cassette, CD, digital download; Label: Erol Köse		35,000
2009	İki Melek (Two Angels)	Released: 25 June 2009: Format: CD, digital download; Label: Avrupa	Mü-yap: Gold	51,165
2011	Dört Dörtlük (Perfect)	Tarih: 9 June 2011: Format: CD, digital download; Label: Avrupa		25,000
2014	İkinci Hal (The Latter State)	Released: 17 October 2014: Format: CD, digital download; Label: DMC / BNG Müzik	DMC: Digital	18,000
2017	Altın Çağ (Golden Age)	Released: 31 May 2017: Format: CD, digital download; Label: DMC / Felix		

=== Remix albums ===
Year	Album	Album	Certifications	Sales
2000	Sen Bir Çiçeksin Özel..	Released: 12 May 2001: Format: Cassette, CD, digital download; Label: Müyada Müzik		

== Singles ==
=== As lead artist ===
Year	Title	Info.	Sales
2010	"Sırada Sen Varsın" (You're Next)	Released: June 2010: Format: CD, digital download; Label: Avrupa	31,077
2012	"Anlatacaklarım Var" (Have A Story To Tell)	Released: November 2012: Format: CD, digital download; Label: DMC / BNG Müzik	
2013	"Saygımdan" (Out of Respect)	Released: November 2013: Format: CD, digital download; Label: DMC / BNG Müzik	
2016	"Hodri Meydan" (I Dare You)	Released: March 2016: Format: CD, digital download; Label: DMC / BNG Müzik	
2016	"Sığamıyorum" (I Cannot Fit In)	Released: June 2016: Format: CD, digital download; Label: DMC / BNG Müzik	
2019	"Yazık" (Pity)	Released: February 2019: Format: CD, digital download; Label: DMC / BNG Müzik	
2019	"Günaydın" (Good Morning)	Released: November 2019: Format: CD, digital download; Label: DMC / BNG Müzik	
2022	"Kimse Bilmesin" (Nobody Should Know)	Released: February 2022: Format: Digital download; Label: DMC	
2022	"Tatlı" (Sweet)	Released: May 2022: Format: Digital download; Label: DMC	
2022	"Bayıla Bayıla" (Eagerly)	Released: December 2022: Format: Digital download; Label: DMC	
2022	"Zaman" (Time)	Released: December 2022: Format: Digital download; Label: DMC	
2023	"Veto"	Released: June 2023: Format: Digital download; Label: DMC	
2023	"Mesajın Var" (You've Got a Message)	Released: August 2023: Format: Digital download; Label: DMC	
2024	"Aleyhime" (Against Me)	Released: February 2024: Format: Digital download; Label: BNG Müzik	
2024	"Kül Kedisi" (Cinderella)	Released: November 2024: Format: Digital download; Label: BNG Müzik	
2025	"Kervan" (Caravan)	Released: January 2025: Format: Digital download; Label: BNG Müzik	
2025	"Karma"	Released: July 2025: Format: Digital download; Label: BNG Müzik	
2025	"Sebebi Sensin" (You're the Reason)	Released: December 2025: Format: Digital download; Label: BNG Müzik	
2026	"Ya Sen Gidip de" (But You Go and)	Released: May 2026: Format: Digital download; Label: Dokuz Sekiz Müzik	
2026	"Dur Nereye" (Wait, Where Are You Going?)	Released: July 2026: Format: Digital download; Label: BNG Müzik	

=== As featured artist ===
Year	Song	Album
2011	"Artık Sevmeyeceğim" (Suat Ateşdağlı feat. Bengü)	Bosphorus Night 4
2013	"Kolay Gelsin" (Erdem Kınay feat. Bengü)	Proje 2
2018	"Yorma" (Enbe Orkestrası feat. Bengü & Doğukan Medetoğlu)	Enbe Orkestrası 2018
2019	"İçimden Gelmiyor" (Bilal Sonses feat. Bengü)	Non-album single
2019	"Bir Günah Gibi"	Fikret Şeneş Şarkıları
2022	"Heyecan"	Serdar Ortaç Şarkıları, Vol. 1
2023	"Bu Aşk Yerde Kalmaz"	Piyanist 3 (Next Generation)

== Charts ==
List of singles, release date and album name
Single	Year	Peak	Album
Single	Year	TR	Album
"Korkma Kalbim" (feat. Serdar Ortaç)	2007	4	Taktik
"Unut Beni"	2007	2	Taktik
"Gezegen"	2008	9	Gezegen
"Doya Doya Tat"	2008	12	Gezegen
"İki Melek"	2009	1	İki Melek
"Kocaman Öpüyorum"	2009	1	İki Melek
"Gelen Seni Soruyor"	2010	7	İki Melek
"Sırada Sen Varsın"	2010	4	Sırada Sen Varsın
"Aşkım"	2011	2	Dört Dörtlük
"Saat 03:00"	2011	4	Dört Dörtlük
"Haberin Olsun"	2012	—	Anlatacaklarım Var
"Yaralı"	2013	1	Anlatacaklarım Var
"Saygımdan"	2013	1	Saygımdan
"Sahici"	2014	1	İkinci Hal
"Feveran"	2015	5	İkinci Hal
"Sığamıyorum"	2016	3	Sığamıyorum
"Kuzum"	2017	2	Altın Çağ
"Geçmiş Olsun"	2018	7	Altın Çağ
"Yazık"	2019	10	Non-album single
"—" indicates that the songs were not included in the lists or the results were not disclosed.

== Music videos ==
Year	Song	Album	Director	Reference(s)
2000	"Sen Bir Çiçeksin"	Hoş Geldin	Deniz Akel	
2000	"Güller Yanıyor"	Hoş Geldin	—N/a	
2005	"Korkumdan Ağladım"	Bağlasan Durmam	Devrim Yalçın	
2005	"Gel Gel"	Bağlasan Durmam	—N/a	
2005	"Ciddi Ciddi"	Bağlasan Durmam	—N/a	
2006	"Müjde"	Bağlasan Durmam	—N/a	
2006	"Bağlasan Durmam"	Bağlasan Durmam	Tülay İbak	
2007	"Korkma Kalbim"	Taktik	Mustafa Uslu	
2007	"Unut Beni"	Taktik	Kubilay Kasap	
2008	"Gezegen"	Gezegen	Murad Küçük	
2009	"İki Melek"	İki Melek	Mehmet Turgut	
2009	"Kocaman Öpüyorum"	İki Melek	Emir Khalilzadeh	
2010	"Gelen Seni Soruyor"	İki Melek	Murad Küçük	
2010	"Sırada Sen Varsın"	Sırada Sen Varsın	Hakan Yonat	
2010	"Sırada Sen Varsın (Remix)"	Sırada Sen Varsın	Avrupa Müzik Pro.	
2011	"Artık Sevmeyeceğim"	Bosphorus Night 4	Salih Singin	
2011	"Aşkım"	Dört Dörtlük	Burak Ertaş	
2011	"Saat 03:00"	Dört Dörtlük	Murat Onbul	
2012	"Kalbi Olan Ağlıyor"	Dört Dörtlük	Salih Singin	
2012	"Haberin Olsun"	Anlatacaklarım Var	Nihat Odabaşı	
2013	"Yaralı"	Anlatacaklarım Var	Murad Küçük	
2013	"Saygımdan"	Saygımdan	Burak Ertaş	
2014	"Sahici"	İkinci Hal	Burak Ertaş	
2014	"İkinci Hal"	İkinci Hal	Gülşen Aybaba	
2015	"Feveran"	İkinci Hal	Gülşen Aybaba	
2015	"Kapıda Yalnızlık"	İkinci Hal	Gülşen Aybaba	
2016	"Hodri Meydan"	Hodri Meydan	Gülşen Aybaba	
2016	"Sığamıyorum"	Sığamıyorum	Ulaş Elgin	
2017	"Kuzum"	Altın Çağ	Gülşen Aybaba	
2017	"Sanki"	Altın Çağ	Gülşen Aybaba	
2018	"Geçmiş Olsun"	Altın Çağ	Gülşen Aybaba	
2018	"Altın Çağ"	Altın Çağ	Ali Riza Cankorur	
2019	"Yazık"	Yazık	Elif Demiralp	
2019	"İçimden Gelmiyor"	İçimden Gelmiyor	Ahmet Can Tekin	
2019	"Günaydın"	Günaydın	Ulaş Elgin	
2022	"Kimse Bilmesin"	Kimse Bilmesin	Ecem Gündoğdu	
2022	"Tatlı"	Tatlı	Ecem Gündoğdu	
2022	"Bayıla Bayıla"	Bayıla Bayıla	Ecem Gündoğdu	
2022	"Zaman"	Zaman	Ecem Gündoğdu	
2023	"Bu Aşk Yerde Kalmaz"	Piyanist 3 (Next Generation)	—N/a	
2023	"Veto"	Veto	Ramazan Arslankaya	
2023	"Mesajın Var"	Mesajın Var	Ramazan Arslankaya	
2024	"Aleyhime"	Aleyhime	Ecem Gündoğdu	
2024	"Kül Kedisi"	Kül Kedisi	Samet Eruzun & Ümit Şahin	
2025	"Kervan"	Kervan	Samet Eruzun & Ümit Şahin	
2025	"Karma"	Karma	Murad Küçük	
2025	"Sebebi Sensin"	Sebebi Sensin	Bengü	
2026	"Ya Sen Gidip de"	Ya Sen Gidip de	Murad Küçük	
2026	"Dur Nereye"	Dur Nereye	Ecem Gündoğdu	
