= Frame of Mind (album) =

Studio album by Sandy
- Released: 26 May 2006
- Length: 50:21
- Label: Starwatch
- Producer: Alain Bertoni; Christian Hamm; Kent Larsson; Kiko Masbaum

Sandy chronology
Unexpected (2004)	Frame of Mind (2006)

Singles from Frame of Mind
- 1. "Crash" Released: 12 May 2006; 2. "Living Without You" Released: 17 November 2006

Frame of Mind is the second studio album by German singer Sandy. It was released by Starwatch Music on 26 May 2006 in German-speaking Europe, marking her debut with the label following her departure from Cheyenne Records in 2004. Further developing the pop rock direction of her debut, 2004's Unexpected, Sandy worked primarily with Kiko Masbaum on material for the album. Additional production was provided by Kent Larsson and production duo Alain Bertoni and Christian Hamm.

Critical reception was mixed, with reviewers describing the album as "can be listened to really well," but ultimately noting that it contains "no long-lasting and particularly sophisticated songs," despite its blend of pop, soft rock, and ballad influences. Commercially, the album peaked at number 53 on the German Albums Chart and failed to chart elsewhere, a notable decline from Unexpected. The album produced the singles "Crash", a The Primitives cover, and "Living Without You".

== Promotion ==
Two singles were released in support of Frame of Mind. The lead single, "Crash," a cover version of the 1988 hit single by British indie pop band The Primitives, peaked at number 24 on the German Singles Chart, becoming Sandy's fourth consecutive solo top thirty entry, although it failed to chart elsewhere. The second and final single, the ballad "Living Without You," reached number 36 in Germany, where it spent six weeks inside the top 100, and also charted in Austria, peaking at number 71.

== Critical reception ==
Professional ratings
Review scores
Source	Rating
CDStarts	5/10 stars

Tanja Kraus from CDStarts gave the album a 5/10 rating. She wrote that the album "can be listened to really well," noting that although Sandy "proves that the term casting is not synonymous with underground quality," the record ultimately offers "no long-lasting and particularly sophisticated songs." She further characterized it as a generally accessible pop album that, despite some variation between pop, soft rock, and ballads, remains largely conventional in its structure and execution.

== Commercial performance ==
Frame of Mind debuted and peaked at number 53 on the German Albums Chart, representing a significant decline in commercial performance compared to its predecessor Unexpected (2004), which had reached number 13 on the same chart. It would also remain Sandy's last solo studio album to date.

== Track listing ==
Frame of Mind – Standard edition
No.	Title	Writer(s)	Producer(s)	Length
1.	"Crash"	Tracy Spencer; Paul Court; Steve Dullaghan	Kiko Masbaum; Flo Peil^{[A]}	2:27
2.	"It's Over"	Sandy Mölling; Michelle Leonard; Martin Fliegenschmidt	Masbaum; Kent Larsson	3:12
3.	"The Verdict"	AJ Junior; Larsson; Peter Landin	Masbaum; Peil^{[A]}	3:54
4.	"Gone"	Mölling; Thorsten Brötzmann; Alexander Geringas	Alain Bertoni; Christian Hamm	3:54
5.	"Can't Remember to Forget You"	Anna Johansson; Linus Nordén; Patrick Johansson	Bertoni; Hamm	3:41
6.	"Venom"	Masbaum; Leonard	Masbaum	3:14
7.	"Occupied"	Mölling; Masbaum; Leonard	Masbaum	3:56
8.	"Living Without You"	Mölling; Fliegenschmidt; Masbaum; Leonard	Masbaum	4:34
9.	"I Do"	Mölling; Allan Eshuijs; Per Aldeheim; Tony Cornelissen	Bertoni; Hamm	2:48
10.	"Tattooed On Me"	Masbaum; Leonard	Masbaum	3:16
11.	"Stay"	Harry Sommerdahl; Kinda Hamid; Rebecca Hortlund	Larsson; Masbaum	3:28
12.	"Speed of Love"	Charlie Dore; Joacim Persson; Maryann Morgan; Niclas Molinder; Pelle Ankarberg	Bertoni; Hamm	327
13.	"Happiness Amazed"	Fredrik Svartdahl; Jonny Sjo; Kim Ofstad	Larsson	4:36
14.	"We Can"	Henrik Korpi; Mathias Wollo; Tom Nichols	Masbaum	3:33
Total length:				50:21

Notes

- ^{^[A]} denotes co-producer

== Personnel and credits ==
Credits adapted from the liner notes of Frame of Mind.

Musicians

- Martin Fly – guitar
- Krischan Frehse – bass
- Bassel El Hallak – guitar
- Christian Hamm – instruments
- Guido Jöris – backing vocals
- Kent Larsson – keyboards
- Kiko Masbaum – backing vocals, keyboards
- Sandy Mölling – backing vocals, lead vocals
- Flo Peil – drums, guitar
- Tsega Tebege – backing vocals
- Jan van der Toorn – backing vocals

Technical

- Alain Bertoni – producer, recording
- Martin Fly – programming
- Christian Hamm – producer, recording
- Jeo – mixing
- Kent Larsson – producer, recording
- Kiko Masbaum – producer, recording
- Ronald Prent – mixing
- Rob Sannen – mixing assistance
- Reinhard Schaub – mixing

== Charts ==
Weekly chart performance for Frame of Mind
Chart (2006)	Peak position
German Albums (Offizielle Top 100)	53
