= Born a Woman =

Single by Sandy Posey

from the album Born a Woman
- B-side: "Caution to the Wind"
- Released: March 1966
- Recorded: Nashville
- Length: 1:57
- Label: MGM
- Songwriter(s): Martha Sharp
- Producer(s): Chips Moman

Sandy Posey singles chronology
"Born a Woman" (1966)	"Single Girl" (1966)

"Born a Woman" is a song by American pop singer Sandy Posey, produced by Chips Moman in Nashville on March 15, 1966. This reached No.12 on the Billboard Hot 100 in August 1966. It sold over one million copies and was awarded a gold disc.

"Born a Woman" features prominent piano, understated strings and horns, and distinctive multitracked vocals. Posey received two Grammy Award nominations for "Born a Woman" in the categories of vocal performance (female) and contemporary (R&R) solo vocal. "Born a Woman" was covered in Australia in 1966 by Judy Stone, and her version and Posey's reached third and second respectively in the national charts in that country. The song was listed as No.23 in Billboard Year-End Hot 100 singles of 1966. Posey's original reached No.7 on the Canadian chart and No.24 on the UK chart.

The song was later covered by Nick Lowe on his Bowi EP and by Hubble Bubble. It was later used by Rush Limbaugh for his "Feminist Update".
