= Unexpected (song) =

Single by Sandy

from the album Unexpected
- Released: 6 February 2005
- Length: 3:39
- Label: Cheyenne; Universal
- Songwriter(s): Steve Lee; Pete Martin; Tina Harris
- Producer(s): Pete Martin

Sandy singles chronology
"Tell Me" (2004)	"Unexpected" (2005)	"Crash" (2006)

"Unexpected" is a song by German recording artist Sandy. It was written by Pete Martin, Steve Lee, and Tina Harris, and recorded for her debut solo album, Unexpected (2004), while production was helmed by the former. A remix version of the uptempo song, featuring additional vocals from German rapper Manuell and produced by Mark Tabak, Ismail Boulaghmal, and Jan van der Toorn for 3Kings Productions, was released as the album's third and final single in February 2005. Also serving as Rhineland-Palatinate's entry at the Bundesvision Song Contest 2005, where it eventually finished last, "Unexpected" reached the top thirty of the German Singles Chart.

== Track listings ==
2-Track CD single
No.	Title	Length
1.	"Unexpected" (Remix)	3:38
2.	"Unexpected" (Instrumental)	3:37

Maxi single
No.	Title	Length
1.	"Unexpected" (Remix)	3:38
2.	"Unexpected" (Remix without Rap)	3:02
3.	"Unexpected" (A Cappella)	3:37
4.	"Unexpected" (Instrumental)	3:37
5.	"Unexpected" (Extended Version)	4:23

== Charts ==
Chart performance for "Unexpected"
Chart (2005)	Peak position
Austria (Ö3 Austria Top 40)	52
Germany (GfK)	29
