= One in a Million (Sandy Mölling song) =

Song by Sandy Mölling

from the album Unexpected
- Recorded: 2004
- Genre: Pop rock
- Length: 3:32
- Label: Cheyenne; Polydor
- Songwriters: Negin Djafari; Toby Gad
- Producer: Toby Gad

"One in a Million" is a song by German artist Sandy Mölling on her 2004 debut album, Unexpected. It was covered by Miley Cyrus for the soundtrack to season two of the television series Hannah Montana, and released on the accompanying soundtrack album Hannah Montana 2 (2007). Cyrus' cover was certified gold by the Recording Industry Association of America (RIAA) on March 10, 2023.

Mölling's version of the song contains an alcohol reference with the line "I feel drunk but I am sober. And I'm smiling all over." For Hannah Montana's version, the line was changed to "Can't believe that I'm so lucky. I have never felt so happy."

In the Hannah Montana episode "You Are So Sue-able to Me", "One in a Million" is featured in the background with Jackson. It was used as the end of the episode "Achy Jakey Heart (Part 1)". In the episode "Song Sung Bad", Lilly asks Miley to sing the song for her mom's birthday present because it is her favorite Hannah song. Miley decides to have Lilly sing it herself because her mother would appreciate that more.

The song has also been covered by Japanese pop-rock singer Anna Tsuchiya, who changed the lyrics to keep only the music from the original song. The song in question is called "BLUE MOON" and is present on the track list of her 2006 single "Slap that Naughty Body/My Fate".

== Charts ==
| Chart (2007) | Peak position |
|---|---|
| U.S. Billboard Bubbling Under Hot 100 | 12 |
| U.S. Billboard Pop 100 | 96 |

== Certification ==
Certification for "One In A Million" (Hannah Montana version)
| Region | Certification | Certified units/sales |
|---|---|---|
| United States (RIAA) | Gold | 500,000^{‡} |
^{‡} Sales+streaming figures based on certification alone.
