= Sandy Mölling =

German pop singer

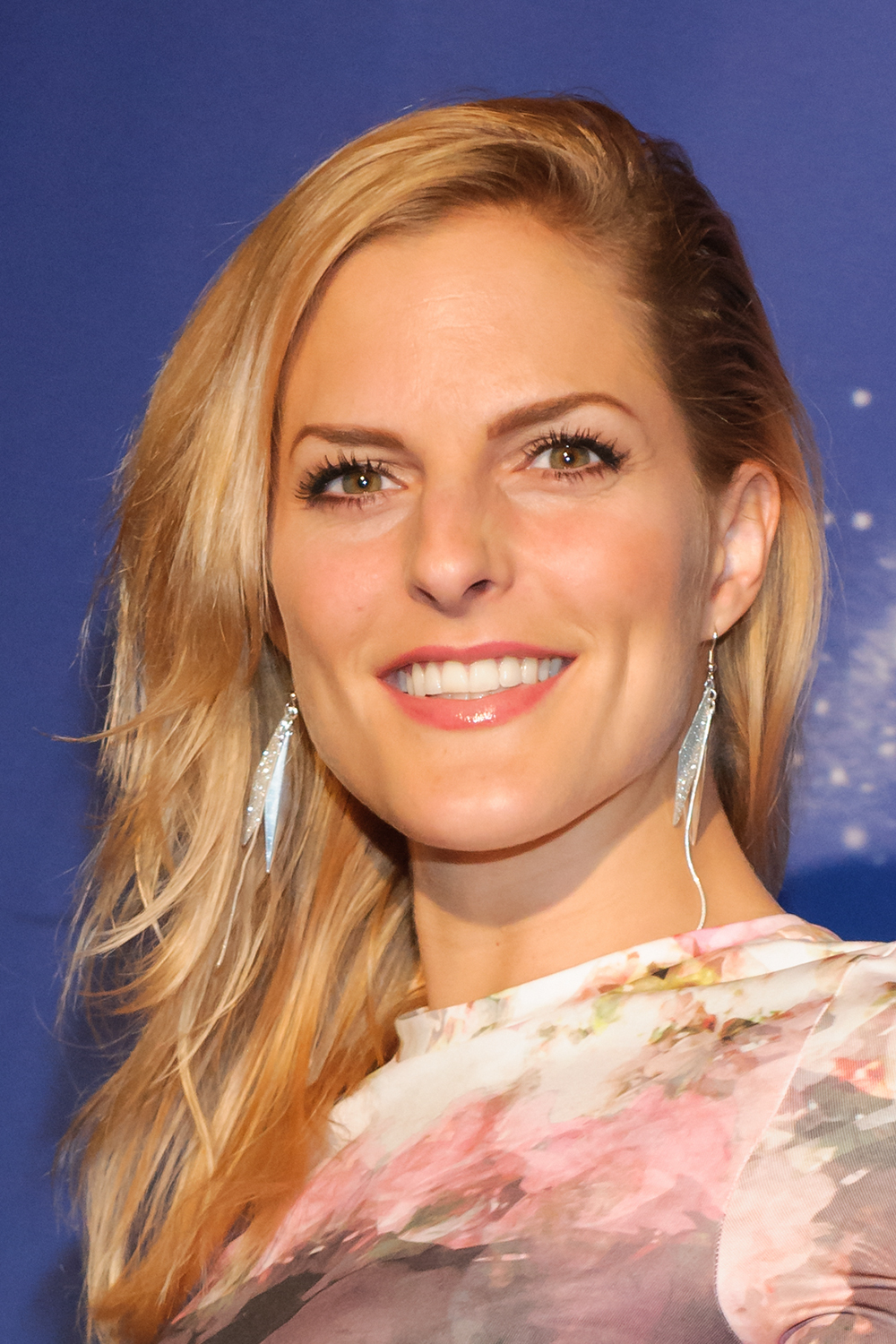
- Mölling in 2013
- Born: 27 April 1981 (age 45); Wuppertal, West Germany
- Occupations: Singer; television personality
- Years active: 2000–present
- Children: 2
- Musical career
- Genres: Pop; pop rock
- Labels: Cheyenne; Starwatch
- Website: sandy-moelling.com

Sandy Mölling (born 27 April 1981) is a German singer and television personality. She rose to fame as one of the members of the girl group No Angels, which were formed in 2000 on the German television talent show Popstars, becoming one of the best-selling girl groups of European origin of all time. During their hiatus, Mölling released a solo album, Unexpected (2004), which produced the top ten singles "Unnatural Blonde" and "Tell Me", and became a judge on the fourth season of Popstars.

In 2006, she released her second studio album Frame of Mind to moderate success and finished third on the debut season of Let's Dance. The following year, she became a presenter and actress in several short-living television shows on Sat.1, Das Vierte, and VIVA Germany before serving as a judge on Die singende Firma. In 2010, Mölling made her stage debut in the musical Vom Geist der Weihnacht, which led her to parts in productions such as Joseph and the Amazing Technicolor Dreamcoat and Cabaret. For starring as Eliza Doolittle in the 2016 Bad Hersfeld revival of the musical My Fair Lady, she won the Audience Award for Favorite Actress.

Throughout her career, Mölling has scored four number-one hits and sold over five million albums and singles worldwide. Outside her work in the entertainment industry, she is involved in many charitable activities, promoting various causes, including education, children's care and animal welfare. In 2015, she co-authored the children's book Pumpel, der Baumzwerg along with her mother.

== Early life ==
Mölling was born in Wuppertal, North Rhine-Westphalia, West Germany, to Lothar Mölling, a graduate engineer, and his first wife, Dagmar Sprenger-Fuchs, a nurse. She has three brothers, Brian, Kevin and Dustin, and a younger half sister named Melina. After her parents' divorce, Mölling, her mother, and her siblings moved from Remscheid to Koblenz, where she finished secondary school and later quit the gymnasium to start an apprenticeship as a retail saleswoman at a jeans retailer. Mölling performed in various singing competitions and became a studio singer in her teenage years.

== Career ==
=== 2000–2003: Breakthrough with No Angels ===
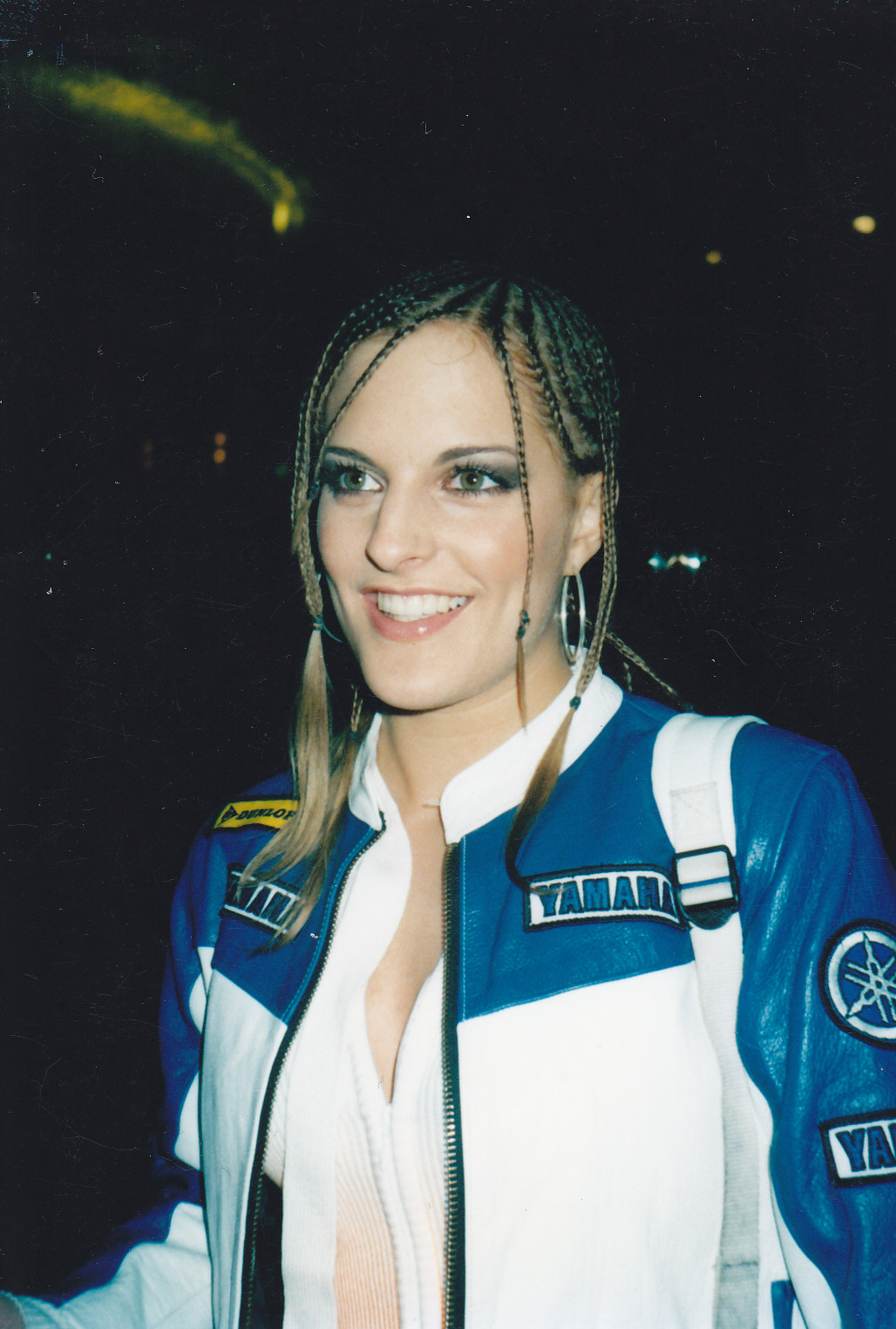
Mölling backstage in 2002

In 2000, Mölling auditioned for the debut installment of the German reality television program Popstars, entering the competition with thousands of other women. She earned a position in the top 30 finalists and immediately travelled to Mallorca, Spain to join her competitors for a workshop, where she made it to the final 10 on the show despite her struggles with dancing choreographies. During a special episode in November 2000, jury member Moslener eventually disclosed that Sandy was chosen to become part of the final five-member girl group No Angels.

With the final five members of the band in place, Popstars continued tracking the development and struggles of the group who left homes to move into a shared flat near Munich, Bavaria. However, it took another four months until the band released their debut single "Daylight in Your Eyes", which would subsequently appear on the band's debut album Elle'ments (2001). Both the single and the album became an unexpected but record-breaking success, when both instantly entered the top position on the Austrian, German and Swiss Media Control singles, albums and airplay charts, making No Angels one of the most successful debuts in years.

In the following years, No Angels released another two number-one studio albums, Now... Us! and Pure, a live album and a successful swing album branded When the Angels Swing, totalling twelve singles altogether - including four-number one singles. Eventually selling more than five million singles and albums worldwide, No Angels became the best-selling German girl group to date and the second most successful girl group of continental Europe between the years of 2001 and 2003 after Atomic Kitten. On 5 September 2003 the four remaining members of the band (Jessica Wahls had left the band following the birth of her first child in March 2003) announced that they would no longer be performing together after three years of continual touring and increasing cases of illness. The release of The Best of No Angels in November of the same year marked the end of the band, with each member going their separate ways in early 2004.

=== 2004–2006: Career development ===
A strong opponent of the disbandment of No Angels, Mölling, who felt less exhausted than her former bandmates, launched her solo career only months after the group's final concert. The singer spent much of early 2004 with the recording of her solo debut album Unexpected which saw her reteaming with No Angels' Scandinavian team of songwriters and producers, including Niclas Molinder and Joacim Persson of production team Twin. Produced under the group's former label, Cheyenne Records, it was preceded by the single "Unnatural Blonde" which reached number eight on the German Singles Chart and would become the highest-charting single among the solo releases by all former band members. The summer-laid follow-up "Tell Me", a ballad, saw similar success in August of the same year, becoming another top ten hit.

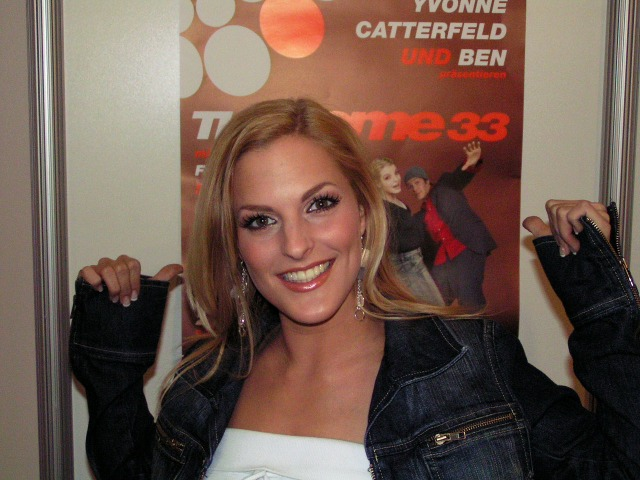
Mölling backstage at The Dome in Salzburg, 2005

In mid-2004, Mölling along with Lukas Loules and Uwe Fahrenkrog-Petersen joined the jury on Popstars – Jetzt oder nie!, the fourth season of the German Popstars adaptation, becoming the first former winner to serve as a judge. Unexpected was released on 13 September 2004 and debuted at number 13 on the German Albums Chart. It earned a generally mixed reception from critics who called it uneven and compared the sound to No Angels's latest records. A remix version of the album opener "Unexpected" featuring additional vocals from German rapper Manuellsen, was released as the album's third and final single and served as Rhineland-Palatinate's entry at the Bundesvision Song Contest 2005 after Mölling had been chosen to represent state at the annual song competition. The singer eventually finished last with 10 points, while the single entered at a moderate number 29 on the German Singles Chart. One of the commercially most successful female singers of the year in Germany, Mölling received Echo Award and 1 Live Krone nominations in the Female Artist National categories for her solo efforts.

After a few hosting jobs and a sudden label change Sandy released her minor succeeded second album, Frame of Mind (#53), in May 2006 via Starwatch Music. The album's first single, "Crash", was a cover version of the same-titled 1988 UK hit (released by The Primitives) and peaked at number 24 on the German singles chart. Additionally Sandy was seen as a competitor in TV contest Let's Dance, eventually ending third. The album's second single, "Living without You" was released in November 2006 and entered the German Singles Chart at number 36.The song was lyrically dedicated to her step father who died in early 2005.

=== 2007–2011: Reformation of the band ===
In mid-2006, Mölling agreed upon former bandmate Lucy Diakovska's request to reunite for a musical comeback. However, all band members have affirmed that they will continue to pursue individual careers as solo artists at suitable opportunities. Sandy has also presented three television programmes on two different German networks, including Autsch TV on Das Vierte and both Du bist... and Damenwahl on the music channel VIVA.

=== 2012–present: Further solo commitments ===
In 2017, Mölling appeared on the second season of German competitive dancing talent show Dance Dance Dance. She was paired with fellow Popstars winner Bahar Kızıl, former member of pop trio Monrose.

== Personal life ==
Between 2002 and 2008, Mölling was in a relationship with the Dutch dancer Renick Bernadina. The couple separated before the birth of their son Jayden, whom Mölling gave birth to in Koblenz on 27 March 2009. The same year, she began a relationship with the Canadian singer, songwriter, and record producer Nasri Atweh, whom she had met the previous year while working on the No Angels album Welcome to the Dance (2009). In July 2015, Mölling relocated to Los Angeles. On 4 October of the same year, they welcomed their first son together, Noah. Mölling and Atweh were married in 2020 during the COVID-19 pandemic. The family first lived in Woodland Hills, Los Angeles. In 2025, Mölling returned to Germany with her younger son and settled in Bonn. The family divides its time between both places.

== Discography ==
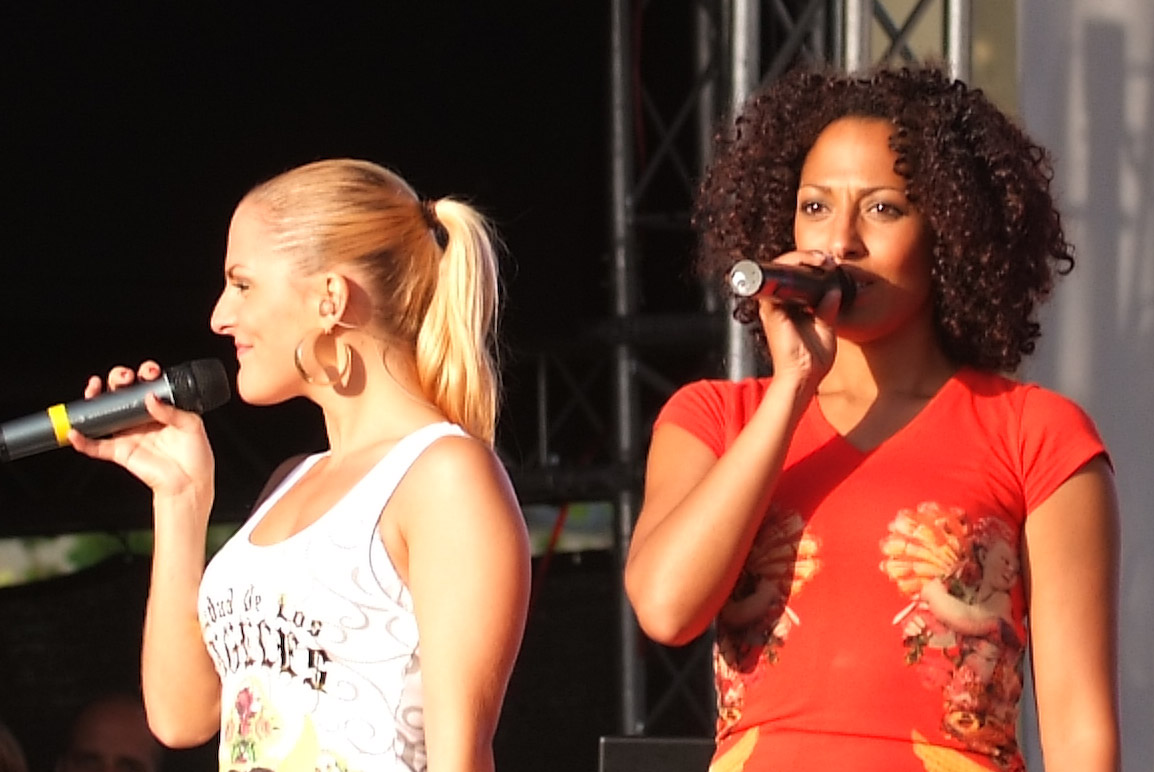
Mölling performing alongside Jessica Wahls in 2008

=== Studio albums ===
List of albums, with selected chart positions and certifications
Title	Album details	Peak chart positions		
Title	Album details	AUT	GER	SWI
Unexpected	Released: 13 September 2004; Label: Cheyenne; Formats: CD, digital download	73	13	91
Frame of Mind	Released: 26 May 2006; Labels: Starwatch; Formats: CD, digital download	—	53	—
"—" denotes releases that did not chart or were not released in that territory.

=== Singles ===
List of singles, with selected chart positions and certifications
Title	Year	Peak chart positions			Album
Title	Year	AUT	GER	SWI	Album
"Unnatural Blonde"	2004	29	8	41	Unexpected
"Tell Me"	2004	34	10	46	Unexpected
"Unexpected" (featuring Manuellsen)	2005	52	29	—	Unexpected
"Crash"	2006	—	24	—	Frame of Mind
"Living Without You"	2006	71	36	—	Frame of Mind
