= Chloë (Australian singer) =

Australian singer-songwriter

- Birth name: Chloë Jane Walton
- Born: Melbourne, Victoria, Australia
- Genres: Pop
- Occupation: Musician
- Instruments: Vocals; guitar; piano
- Years active: 2003–present
- Labels: Epic/Sony BMG

Chloë Jane Walton, who performs mononymously as Chloë, is an Australian singer-songwriter. She had a top 10 hit on the ARIA Singles Chart with her cover version of the Primitives' 1988 track, "Crash", in September 2005.

== Biography ==
Chloë Jane Walton, grew up in Melbourne with "an artistic family background." Her mother is a visual artist and her father is a writer and teacher. She was classically trained in piano and voice. In 1997 she travelled to Vancouver, to continue studying music and taking up the guitar, where she "landed an internship at Nettwerk Records."

Chloë's debut single, "Stars", was released in Australia on 24 September 2004 through Epic/Sony BMG and peaked at number 66 on the ARIA Singles Chart. It was co-written by the singer with Michelle Lewis and Dan Petty. Ten tracks were recorded at the Garage studio, Los Angeles, with Paul Fox producing and guest musicians including Dorian Crozier on drums and Curt Schneider on bass guitar. In September 2005 she released a cover version of the Primitives' 1988 track, "Crash", as her second single, which peaked at number 10.

== Discography ==
=== Singles ===
List of singles
Year	Title	Peak chart positions
Year	Title	AUS
2004	"Stars"	66
2005	"Crash"	10
