= Şehrazat =

Turkish musical artist (born 1952)

- Also known as: Şehro, Scheherazade, Şehrazad
- Born: Şehrazat Kemali Söylemezoğlu; 3 September 1952 (age 73); Ankara, Turkey
- Origin: Istanbul, Ankara
- Genres: Vocal jazz, Turkish music, traditional pop, third stream, synthpop, swing revival, soft rock, schlager, rhythm and blues, ragtime, psychedelic music, power pop, pop rock, jump blues, Italo disco, indie pop, glam rock, Europop, Euro disco, easy listening, disco house, deep house, dance-pop, cool jazz, chanson, Britpop, bebop, avant-garde jazz, Arabesque, Americana, a cappella
- Occupations: Businesswoman, celebutante, composer, lyricist, performance artist, record producer, singer-songwriter, soloist, television personality, vocalist
- Instrument: Vocals
- Years active: 1967–present
- Labels: Odeon Records, EMI Music, Sony BMG Music Entertainment, Şehrazat Music, Disco Plak by Selahattin Beyazıt and Antuan Şoriz, İstanbul Gelişim Orchestra, Süheyl Denizci Orchestra, ...

Şehrazat Kemali Söylemezoğlu (born 3 September 1952), known by her stage name Şehrazat or Şehro, is a Turkish television personality, businesswoman, philanthropist, composer, songwriter, record producer, occasional jazz, and pop music singer.

== Life and career ==
=== Early life and family ===
Her father S. Siham Kemali Söylemezoğlu (d. 13 April 1981; Vienna) was a notable businessman and was considered to be the first mining magnate of Turkey. Her grandfather is Süleyman Şefik Pasha, the son of the Beylerbey of Rumelia Ali Kemali Pasha who is the only brother of Edhem Pertev Pasha and one of the former governors of Konya. Her mother Sevinç Tevs was the sister of artist Sevim Tevs and the daughter of the Turkish ambassador to the Republic of Albania. She was the first internationally known jazz singer of Turkey and described by the authorities as having one of the most wondrous voices of the 20th century. She was regarded as a diva since she surpassed Sarah Vaughan and won the 1948 Miami Jazz Festival, with the song "For You" that was composed by their family friend Arif Mardin, the 12-time Grammy Award winning Turkish-American music producer. She graduated from the International School of Choueifat, in Beirut, Lebanon in 1970. It was her parents' wish that she attend it for the sake of a better education. Prior to this, she spent the vast majority of her childhood in Turkey. Şehrazat is exceedingly fluent in Turkish, Arabic, French, and English.

As an only child from an affluent family, Şehrazat has received a large amount of mass media's attention due to her wealth and lifestyle. However, she has a half-brother Süleyman Şefik Söylemezoğlu named after their paternal grandfather, who is the son of Aynur Bıyıktay-Söylemezoğlu (the daughter of Ömer Halis Bıyıktay and the niece of Kâzım Karabekir, from her mother's side). Şehrazat's maternal great-grandfather is the most widely recognized composer of Turkish Classical Music, Hammamizade İsmail Dede Efendi. Having been married to the daughter of diplomat and author Galip Kemali Söylemezoğlu, the great-uncle of Şehrazat, Hüsrev Gerede is her uncle by marriage. In addition to this, among her uncles are Cevdet Çağla, a famous composer of Turkish music and Prof. Dr. Hamit Kemali Söylemezoğlu, the architect of Anıtkabir and Taşkışla. Besides, journalist Mithat Perin (preceptor of Abdi İpekçi), diplomat Özer F. Tevs, politician Selim Sarper, and diplomat Yüksel Söylemez are also her close relatives. Some of the grandsons and granddaughters of His Imperial Majesty Mehmet V Reshad, the Emperor of the Ottomans and the Caliph of the Faithful such as HH Prince Cengiz Osmanoğlu, HH Prince Ömer Fevzi Osmanoğlu, HH Mihrimah Sultana are Şehrazat's cousins. Thus, Şehrazat's aunt Perizat Söylemezoğlu-Perin, formerly HH Princess Perizat Söylemezoğlu-Osmanoğlu, was the spouse of HH Prince Mehmet Nazım Osmanoğlu—the eldest son of HIH Prince Mehmed Ziyaeddin Efendi—and is the mother of HH Prince Cengiz Osmanoğlu. Another aunt of Şehrazat is Belkız Rufa Kemali Söylemezoğlu, the socialite. Moreover, Şehrazat's nephew is the former goalkeeper of Galatasaray football club Turgay Şeren and her niece is Hülya Koçyiğit who is a Turkish actress and is considered to be one of Turkish cinema's most famous female leads. Almost everybody in her family has graduated from Galatasaray High School, the most influential school in Turkey.

=== Music career ===
The owner of thousands of Turkish hit works, Şehrazat's first hit song is "Yaz Yaz Yaz" that was sung by Turkish superstar Ajda Pekkan. This song was a reform in Turkish pop music. More recently, Bengü's "Kocaman Öpüyorum" and "Sırada Sen Varsın" are also hits written by Şehrazat. Demet Sağıroğlu's debut "Kınalı Bebek" in 1994, was another very popular song by Şehrazat. Additionally, even though she has a very rare and wondrous voice like her mother does, she is commonly known for her music productions and compositions rather than active performances. Hence, in the late 1970s and the early 1980s, she was known for singing arrangements, most notably, "Aşk Bir Kumarsa" (ABBA's "The Winner Takes It All" cover), "İki Gölge" (Sandy Posey's "All Hung up in Your Green Eyes" cover), "İmkânsız Aşk" (Dusty Springfield's "I Close My Eyes and Count to Ten" cover), and Kelebek (Engelbert Humperdinck's "Free as the Wind (Theme from Papillon)" cover). During the period 1975–87, due to her polyglotism and eclectic, wide-ranging repertoire of contemporary and narrative songs in English, Şehrazat, as a soloist, managed to perform periodically in Playboy and Gala, which were VIP locations featuring Turkey's leading performance artists. With a wealth of great songs and stage presence, her intense show was really appreciated by the audience and the media, however, she decided to quit performing but to keep on songwriting. Her voice is likely to be classified as contralto with a strong lower register since she possesses a significant vocal agility and endurance. That is why Şehrazat is able to sing the high soprano notes and the low baritone notes as well.

Şehrazat was also the producer of superstar Ajda Pekkan, Sibel Tüzün, the former Eurovision Song Contest participant, Yıldız Kaplan, Reyhan Karaca, Zeliha Sunal, and Band AF. Sezen Aksu, another Turkish pop music singer, songwriter and producer who sold over 40 million albums worldwide, is the closest colleague of Şehrazat.

On 2 February 1985, Şehrazat as a special guest star performed in the music feast of a monthly TV-show "Do-Re-Mi", called "Jazz and Dance Night", with the song "Break Me". At the night, there was also a Coşkun Demir-Şehrazat duet "Baby Come to Me". She concurrently appeared in Cem Özer's Star TV show "Laf Lafı Açıyor" on 19 June 1992 and on 3 May 1996 when the show transferred to Kanal D.

=== 30th anniversary tribute ===
On 24 January 2004, Şehrazat celebrated her 30-year anniversary as a lyricist and composer, which took place in the form of a huge concert named "Şehrazat Şarkıları" and given in Istanbul at the Levent İş Sanat Cultural Center in association with Türkiye İş Bankası. She sang some of her greatest hits and had guests such as Sezen Aksu, Nilüfer, Ajda Pekkan, Aşkın Nur Yengi, Emel Müftüoğlu, and Muazzez Abacı join her on stage.

At the instance of Şehrazat, all proceeds from this concert as well as profits from the sales of each ticket sold for the event was donated to the TSK Elele Foundation of the General Staff of the Republic of Turkey, to be used for the rehabilitation and continuous treatment of Turkish Armed Forces personnel, retirees, disabled retirees and their relatives, especially those who were injured or lost any limb in the line of duty for the defense of the country and nation. Apart from this, "Şehrazat Şarkıları" was also aired by the ATV Television Network in 2005.

== Discography ==
=== Extended Play: 1968 ===
- İki Gölge (A-side)
- Dün Gece (B-side)

=== Arrangements: 1969 ===
- Beni Unutma
- İmkânsız Aşk

=== 45 rpm records: 1970s ===
- Kelebek (2:58)
- Dili Dost, Kalbi Düşman (1974)
- Söz Sevgilim, Söz (04:06; A 1974 45 rpm in collaboration with Cömert Baykent)
- Kolkola (Dalida cover; Turkish lyrics by Ümit Yaşar Oğuzcan)
- Ne Kapımı Çalan Var
- Nerede olsan

=== Maxi single: 1980 ===
- Sevemedim Karagözlüm (considered the first maxi-single (MCD) of Turkey)

=== Extended Play: 1980 ===
- Sevemedim Karagözlüm (A-side 4:49)
- Hürüm Artık (A-side 3:52)
- Bahşiş (B-side 3:26)
- Seni Sevmişim (B-side 3:22)

=== Long Play: 1981 ===
- Sevdim Genç Bir Adamı
- Kendim Ettim, Kendim Buldum (Eyvah)
- Yanında
- Aşk Bir Kumarsa
- Kulakların Çınlasın
- Lay la, Lay la (Yaşamaya Bak Sen)

=== Compilation album: 2002 ===
- Bak Bir Varmış Bir Yokmuş: 60'lı ve 70'li Yılların Orijinal Kayıtları

=== Compilation album: 2007 ===
- Our Golden Songs

=== Compilation album: 2008 ===
- Çınar Vol. I (In loving memory of Aysel Gürel, the late lyricist)
  - "Rüşvet" (writer(s), Aysel Gürel, Şehrazat, Volga Tamöz)

== Songwriting credits ==
List of Şehrazat's most-widely known songwriting credits
Year	Artist	Album	Song	Co-written with
1989	Ajda Pekkan	Ajda 90	"Yaz Yaz Yaz"	
1989	Ajda Pekkan	Ajda 90	"Yazık Olur"	
1989	Aşkın Nur Yengi	Sevgiliye...	"Sevgiliye"	
1990	Zerrin Özer	İşte Ben	"Yalan Olur"	
1990	Zerrin Özer	İşte Ben	"Var mı Sende O Yürek?"	
1991	Ajda Pekkan	Seni Seçtim	"Sevgide Seni Seçtim"	
1991	Ajda Pekkan	Seni Seçtim	"Yalnızlığa Hüküm Giydim"	
1991	Ajda Pekkan	Seni Seçtim	"Ölüm Yok Ya Sonunda"	
1991	Ajda Pekkan	Seni Seçtim	"Oyun Etti Gözlerim"	Garo Mafyan (composer)
1991	Ajda Pekkan	Seni Seçtim	"İnanılır Gibi Değil"	Garo Mafyan (composer)
1991	Ajda Pekkan	Seni Seçtim	"Eline Gözüne Dizine Dursun"	Garo Mafyan (composer)
1991	Ajda Pekkan	Seni Seçtim	"Dönüyorum"	Garo Mafyan (composer)
1991	Ajda Pekkan	Seni Seçtim	"Kabus Gibi Gelme Üstüme"	
1991	Ajda Pekkan	Seni Seçtim	"Haydi Durma"	
1991	Ajda Pekkan	Seni Seçtim	"Bu Bahar"	Garo Mafyan (composer)
1991	Ajda Pekkan	Seni Seçtim	"Yalancı Dünya"	Anuş Bakış (lyricist along with Şehrazat)
1991	Aşkın Nur Yengi	Hesap Ver	"Hesap Ver"	
1991	Ayşegül Aldinç	Sorma – Benden Söylemesi	"Delip de Geçer"	
1991	Zerrin Özer	Sevildiğini Bil	"Geri Almaya Geldim" 4:25	Seda Akay (lyricist)
1991	Zerrin Özer	Sevildiğini Bil	"Yok Deme" 5:06	
1992	Nil Burak	İşte Banko	"İşte Banko"	Uğur Dikmen (composer)
1992	Nil Burak	İşte Banko	"Yiğidim"	Uğur Dikmen (composer)
1992	Nil Burak	İşte Banko	"İlle de Yâr"	
1992	Nil Burak	İşte Banko	"Duman Oldum"	Nil Burak (composer)
1992	Nilüfer	Yine Yeni Yeniden	"Çarem Benim"	
1992	Emel Müftüoğlu	Faka Bastın	"Faka Bastın"	
1992	Emel Müftüoğlu	Faka Bastın	"İşine Gelirse"	Greg (composer)
1992	Emel Müftüoğlu	Faka Bastın	"Sev de Nasıl Seversen Sev"	
1992	Emel Müftüoğlu	Faka Bastın	"Yerin Dolmuyor"	Mustafa Sandal (composer)
1992	Gökben	Aşka Çeyrek Var	"Aşka Çeyrek Var"	
1992	Ferdi Özbeğen	Davacı Değilim	"Eline, Gözüne, Dizine Dursun"	Garo Mafyan (composer)
1993	Sezen Aksu	Deli Kızın Türküsü	"Kalbim Ege'de Kaldı"	Sezen Aksu and Yelda Karataş (lyricists along with Şehrazat), Atilla Özdemiroğlu (composer)
1993	Sezen Aksu	Deli Kızın Türküsü	"Dert Faslı"	Sezen Aksu and Yelda Karataş (lyricists along with Şehrazat), Sezen Aksu (composer), Özkan Uğur (composer)
1993	Aşkın Nur Yengi	Sıramı Bekliyorum	"Pembe dizi"	Nikos Antipas (composer)
1993	Aşkın Nur Yengi	Sıramı Bekliyorum	"Yüreğim ağlıyor"	
1994	Demet Sağıroğlu	Kınalı Bebek	"Kınalı bebek" 4:06	Rony Uzay Heparı (composer)
1994	Demet Sağıroğlu	Kınalı Bebek	"Yağızım" 3:00	Sezen Aksu (lyricist)
1994	Demet Sağıroğlu	Kınalı Bebek	"Biçare" 3:20	Rony Uzay Heparı (composer)
1994	Demet Sağıroğlu	Kınalı Bebek	"Bu Saatten Sonra" 5:05	
1994	Demet Sağıroğlu	Kınalı Bebek	"Oyunbozan" 4:22	
1994	Demet Sağıroğlu	Kınalı Bebek	"Yadigâr" 5:30	Demet Sağıroğlu (composer)
1994	Demet Sağıroğlu	Kınalı Bebek	"Benden vazgeçme" 2:42	
1994	Demet Sağıroğlu	Kınalı Bebek	"Kınalı bebek (Pop mix)" 4:14	Ozan Doğulu (remixer)
1994	Demet Sağıroğlu	Kınalı Bebek	"Kınalı bebek (Undertech mix)" 4:42	Sarp Özdemiroğlu (remixer)
1994	Demet Sağıroğlu	Kınalı Bebek	"Kınalı bebek (Club mix)" 5:48	Tansel Doğanay (remixer)
1994	Ayşegül Aldinç	Alev Alev	"Aşk Denen İllet"	Mustafa Sandal (composer), Sarp Özdemiroğlu (composer)
1994	Emel Müftüoğlu	Emelce	"Gözümün Feri"	Murat Yeter (composer), Bülent Sert (composer)
1994	Emel Müftüoğlu	Emelce	"Sevmek En Büyük Devlet"	
1994	Emel Müftüoğlu	Emelce	"Ah Bu Sevda"	Bülent Sert (composer)
1995	Nil Burak	Nil Burak'95: Akdeniz Rüzgârı	"E, Neyse Ne"	Anonymous (composer)
1995	Nâlân	Cansuyum	"Cansuyum"	
1996	Ayşegül Aldinç	Söze Ne Hacet	"Alimallah"	Aykut Gürel (composer)
1996	Ayşegül Aldinç	Söze Ne Hacet	"Bekletme"	Aykut Gürel (composer)
1997	Aşkın Nur Yengi	Haberci	"Yabani"	Adil Omar (composer), Amr Tantawy (composer)
1997	Aşkın Nur Yengi	Haberci	"Haberci"	
1997	Aşkın Nur Yengi	Haberci	"Kanım Akmaz"	Manos Loïzos (composer)
1997	Nilüfer	Nilüfer'le	"Bırak Beni"	
1997	Nilüfer	Nilüfer'le	"Namussuz Akşamlar"	
1997	Nilüfer	Nilüfer'le	"Hasret Çığlıkları"	
1997	Kerim Tekin	Haykırsam Dünyaya	"Motor"	Fedon (lyricist along with Şehrazat), Hakan Demir (composer)
1997	Kerim Tekin	Haykırsam Dünyaya	"Vay O Zaman"	Ozan Doğulu (composer)
1997	Kerim Tekin	Haykırsam Dünyaya	"Dilber"	Kerim Tekin (composer along with Şehrazat)
1998	Demet Sağıroğlu	Sımsıcak	"Yarın olmaz" 4:58	Emre Irmak (composer along with Şehrazat)
1998	Demet Sağıroğlu	Sımsıcak	"Ukte" 4:13	Emre Irmak (composer along with Şehrazat)
1999	Gülben Ergen	Kör Aşık	"Gümbür Gümbür"	
1999	Gülben Ergen	Kör Aşık	"Kim Ne Derse Desin"	
1999	Gülben Ergen	Kör Aşık	"Kurşuni"	Ercan Saatchi (composer)
1999	Sibel Turnagöl	Can Bu	Elli Yıllık Aşk	Bülent Yetiş
2000	Ajda Pekkan	Diva	"Mutlu Bütün Şarkılar (Quand s'arrêtent les violons)"	J.D. Bonny (composer), Roger Candiotti (composer)
2000	Ajda Pekkan	Diva	"Aşka İnanma (Dov'è l'amore)"	Paul Michael Barry (composer), Mark Taylor (composer)
2000	Bengü	Hoş Geldin	"Hoş Geldin"	
2000	Bengü	Hoş Geldin	"Akşama Görüşürüz"	Emre Irmak (composer)
2001	Bengü	Sen Bir Çiçeksin Özel...	"Hoş Geldin (remix)"	
2001	Sertab Erener	Turuncu	"Bahçede" 5:00	
2001	Sertab Erener	Turuncu	"Yağmurdan Sonra Gelen Toprağın Kokusu" 4:45	
2001	Kenan Doğulu	Ex Aşkım	"Kime Ne"	
2001	Nilüfer	Büyük Aşkım	"Beni mi Buldun?"	
2001	Nilüfer	Büyük Aşkım	"Çok Büyüksün"	
2001	Nilüfer	Büyük Aşkım	"Her şey Bir An"	
2002	Gülben Ergen	Sade ve Sadece	"Sade ve Sadece (Elveda)" 4:15	Emre Irmak (composer along with Şehrazat)
2002	Gülben Ergen	Sade ve Sadece	"Teşekkür Ederim" 3:31	Bülent Yetiş (composer)
2002	Gülben Ergen	Sade ve Sadece	"Abayı Yaktım" 4:39	
2002	Gülben Ergen	Sade ve Sadece	"Ne Zaman" 4:10	Taşkın Sabah (composer)
2003	Ajda Pekkan	Sen İste (single)	"Sen İste"	
2003	Ajda Pekkan	Sen İste (single)	"Sen İste (remix)"	
2003	Ajda Pekkan	Sen İste (single)	"Sen İste (ballad)"	
2004	Gülben Ergen	Uçacaksın	"Uçacaksın" 3:24	
2004	Gülben Ergen	Uçacaksın	"Ayrılmam" 4:40	
2004	Gülben Ergen	Uçacaksın	"Git" 3:20	
2004	Aşkın Nur Yengi	Yasemin Yağmurları	"Kardelen"	Oğuz Gökoğlu (lyricist and composer along with Şehrazat)
2005	Gülben Ergen	Fıkır Fıkır 9+1	"Fıkır Fıkır"	
2005	Gülben Ergen	Fıkır Fıkır 9+1	"Uçacaksın No. 2"	
2005	Gülben Ergen	Fıkır Fıkır 9+1	"Ayrılmam No. 2"	
2005	Gülben Ergen	Fıkır Fıkır 9+1	"Git No. 2"	
2005	Yıldız Kaplan	Işıl Işıl	"Sayende"	Anna Vissi (composer)
2006	Gülben Ergen	Gülben Ergen	"Amor"	
2006	Gülben Ergen	Gülben Ergen	"Belki"	
2007	Aşkın Nur Yengi	Aşk'ın Şarkıları	"Hesap Ver"	
2007	Tuğba Özerk	Yıkıldı Duvarlarım	"Yastık" 4:41	
2007	Zerrin Özer	Ömür Geçiyor	"Katmer Katmer" 5:00	
2008	Ajda Pekkan	Aynen Öyle	"Aynen Öyle"	
2008	Ajda Pekkan	Aynen Öyle	"Flu Gibi"	
2008	Ajda Pekkan	Aynen Öyle	"Gerisi Hikâye"	
2008	Ajda Pekkan	Aynen Öyle	"Hiçbir Şey Eskisi Gibi Olamaz"	
2008	Ajda Pekkan	Aynen Öyle	"Flu Gibi (remix)"	
2008	Ayşe Özyılmazel	Uzay Heparı – Sonsuza	"Biçare"	Rony Uzay Heparı (composer)
2008	Yıldız Kaplan	Motive	"Motive" and "Motive (remix)"	Bülent Yetiş (lyricist along with Şehrazat), Bülent Yetiş (composer)
2009	Bengü	İki Melek	"Kocaman Öpüyorum"	
2009	Sibel Can	Benim Adım Aşk	"Kalbimin Kıyıları"	
2010	Bengü	Sırada Sen Varsın (maxi single)	"Sırada Sen Varsın" 3:51	
2010	Bengü	Sırada Sen Varsın (maxi single)	"Sırada Sen Varsın (club mix)" 5:13	
2010	Bengü	Sırada Sen Varsın (maxi single)	"Sırada Sen Varsın (Volga Tamöz version)" 4:18	Volga Tamöz (remixer)
2010	Bengü	Sırada Sen Varsın (maxi single)	"Yalansın" 4:16	
2010	Bengü	Sırada Sen Varsın (maxi single)	"Yalansın (piano version)" 4:46	
2010	Gökhan Özen	Başka	"Teslim Al" 4:07	Bülent Yetiş (composer along with Şehrazat)
2010	Gökhan Özen	Başka	"Ezdirmem" 4:33	
2010	Reyhan Karaca	Yeniden	"Yeniden" 3:36	
2011	Bengü	Dört Dörtlük	"Kadar (pop version by Volga Tamöz)" 05:13	Volga Tamöz (remixer)
2011	Bengü	Dört Dörtlük	"Dört Dörtlük" 05:05	
2011	Bengü	Dört Dörtlük	"Kadar (slow version by Volga Tamöz)" 03:56	Volga Tamöz (remixer)
2012	Mustafa Ceceli	Es	"Aşk Döşeği" 4:39	
2012	Reyhan Karaca	Yaz (maxi single)	"Sevmek En Büyük Devlet"	

== Awards ==
- Runner-up in Hey Magazine's List of Bests and Most Promising Female Singers in 1970 (969 votes)
- Yekta Okur Honorary Award of the 4th Kral TV Video and Music Awards (23 February 1998)
- Song of the Year Award of the 9th Kral TV Video and Music Awards, with the song "Abayı Yaktım" written and composed by Şehrazat (24 March 2003)

== Ancestors ==
Ancestors of Şehrazat

16. Mehmet Teymur Fenni Efendi; (d. 1845; Trabzon) (son of Çolak Molla Musa of Erzurum (circa 1770s) and grandson of Şahan Ali, the pahlawan of Murad IV)
8. Governor Dervish Ali Kemali Pasha; (b. 1818; d. 1898)
17. Kadınefendi
4. Süleyman Şefik Pasha (b. 1860; d. 1946)
9. Pasha Consort
2. S. Sihamettin Kemali Söylemezoğlu; (d. 13 April 1981)
10. Mr. Halapzadeh
5. R. Ayşe Vedad Söylemezoğlu (d. 23 February 1970)
11. Mrs. Halapzadeh
1. Şehrazat Kemali Söylemezoğlu
3. Sevinç Tevs; (b. 1930; d. 24 October 1976) (daughter of Tevs of Albania and great-granddaughter of Hammamizade İsmail Dede Efendi)
