= Living Without You (Sandy Mölling song) =

Single by Sandy

from the album Frame of Mind
- Released: 17 November 2006
- Genre: Pop
- Length: 4:34
- Label: Stwarwatch; Warner
- Songwriter(s): Sandy Mölling; Michelle Leonard; Kiko Masbaum; Martin Fliegenschmidt
- Producer(s): Kiko Masbaum

Sandy singles chronology
"Crash" (2006)	"Living Without You" (2006)

"Living Without You" is a song by German recording artist Sandy Mölling. The pop ballad was written by Mölling along with Michelle Leonard, Martin Fliegenschmidt, and Kiko Masbaum for her second solo album, Frame of Mind (2006), while production was helmed by the latter. Released as the album's second and final single, "Living Without You" peaked at number 36 on the German Singles Chart, becoming the singer's lowest-charting single to date.

== Track listings ==
Maxi single
No.	Title	Length
1.	"Living Without You" (Radio Edit)	3:24
2.	"Tell Me" (Living Without You)	4:21
3.	"Sign o' the Times"	4:23
4.	"Living Without You" (Music video)	3:52

== Charts ==
=== Weekly charts ===
Chart (2006)	Peak position
Germany (GfK)	36
