= Echoes and Rhymes =

Studio album by The Primitives
- Released: April 23, 2012
- Genre: Indie pop
- Label: Elefant

The Primitives chronology
Galore (1991)	Echoes and Rhymes (2012)	Spin-O-Rama (2014)

Echoes and Rhymes is a 2012 studio album by The Primitives. It is their first album since their 2009 reunion. The album collects cover versions of 1960s "obscurities."

== Track listing ==
No.	Title	Original artist	Length
1.	"Panic"	Reparata and the Delrons	2:15
2.	"Turn Off The Moon"	Sue Lyon (from the Lolita soundtrack)	2:17
3.	"Move It On Over"	LeGrand Mellon	2:30
4.	"Sunshine In My Rainy Day Mind"	Polly Niles	2:17
5.	"Till You Say You'll Be Mine"	Jackie DeShannon (but also notably recorded by Olivia Newton-John)	2:37
6.	"I'm Not Sayin'"	Gordon Lightfoot (but also notably recorded by Nico)	2:23
7.	"The Witch"	Adam & Eve	4:01
8.	"I Surrender"	Bonnie St. Claire	2:48
9.	"Amoureux D'une Affiche"	Laura Ulmer	2:45
10.	"Where Will You Be?"	Dana Gillespie	2:17
11.	"Single Girl"	Sandy Posey	2:38
12.	"Who Are You Trying To Fool?"	Little Ann	2:28
13.	"Time Slips Away"	Shocking Blue	2:27
14.	"Wild Flower"	The She Trinity	2:15
