= Stars (Chloë song) =

Single by Chloë
- Released: 24 September 2004
- Recorded: 2004
- Genre: Pop
- Length: 4:07
- Label: Sony BMG Australia
- Songwriter(s): Chloë Walton; Michelle Louis; Dan Petty
- Producer(s): Paul Fox

Chloë singles chronology
"Stars" (2004)	"Crash" (2005)

"Stars" (2004) is the debut single by Chloë from her album Beyond Coming. The song peaked at #66 in Australia.

== Track listing ==
1. "Stars" – 4:07
2. "Stars" (Buchman mix)
3. "Stars" (acoustic)

== Charts ==
Chart (2004)	Peak position
Australia (ARIA Charts)	66
