= Unexpected (Sandy Mölling album) =

Studio album by Sandy
- Released: 13 September 2004
- Length: 46:45
- Labels: Cheyenne; Polydor
- Producers: Pelle Ankarberg; S. Kula; Pete "Boxsta" Martin; Mute8; Nigel Rush; Pam Sheyne; Twin

Sandy chronology
Unexpected (2004)	Frame of Mind (2006)

Singles from Unexpected
- 1. "Unnatural Blonde" Released: 21 May 2004; 2. "Tell Me" Released: 23 August 2004; 3. "Unexpected" Released: 6 February 2005

Unexpected is the debut studio album by German recording artist Sandy. It was released by Cheyenne Records on 13 September 2004 in German-speaking Europe. Issued as the first solo project by a member of No Angels following their 2003 disbandment, the album was primarily produced by David Clewett and Ivar Lisinski from Mute8 as well as Niclas Molinder and Joacim Persson from Twin, with additional contributions from S. Kula, Pete "Boxsta" Martin, Nigel Rush, and Pam Sheyne, among others. Musically, Unexpected is primarily a pop album, incorporating elements of rock pop and electronic music.

Critical reception was mixed, with reviewers noting the album's reliance on conventional pop structures and characterizing it as "pleasant but interchangeable pop" unlikely to expand Sandy's audience. Commercially, Unexpected achieved moderate success, peaking at number 13 in Germany, and spawning three singles, including Unnatural Blonde" and "Tell Me," both top ten hits in Germany. A remix of the title track featuring Manuellsen also reached the top 30 and served as Rhineland-Palatinate's entry at the Bundesvision Song Contest 2005, where it finished last with 10 points.

== Promotion ==
Three singles were released in support of Unexpected. The lead single, "Unnatural Blonde," achieved a top ten position in Germany and reached the top 30 in Austria. "Tell Me," the second single to precede the album's release, likewise attained a top ten position in Germany, peaking at number 10, and also reached the top 40 in Austria. Unexpected's final single, a remix version of "Unexpected" featuring additional vocals from rapper Manuellsen, peaked within the top 30 in Germany, reaching number 29. The song also served as Rhineland-Palatinate's entry at the Bundesvision Song Contest 2005, after Sandy had been selected to represent the state, where it ultimately placed last with 10 points.

== Critical reception ==
Professional ratings
Review scores
Source	Rating
laut.de	1/5 stars

Laut.de editor Christine Barth felt that "much of Sandy's album falls right back into predictable pop patterns and could easily stem from her girl-band days. Though Sandy leans more into R&B and hip hop, the tracks quickly sink into harmonic monotony and simple love-song lyrics. Alternating ballads and upbeat numbers offer little surprise, and despite polished production, everything soon sounds the same." She concluded: "The result: pleasant but interchangeable pop that won’t shift her audience."

== Commercial performance ==
Unexpected achieved moderate commercial success in European markets. In Germany, the album performed strongest, reaching a peak position of number 13 on the German Albums Chart, thereby becoming the highest-charting solo effort by any member of No Angels. It would spend five weeks inside the chart's top 100. In Austria, the album attained a peak of number 73 on the Austrian Albums Chart. Meanwhile, in Switzerland, Unexpected reached number 91 on the Swiss Albums Chart.

== Track listing ==
Unexpected – Standard edition
No.	Title	Writer(s)	Producer(s)	Length
1.	"Unexpected"	Steve Lee; Pete Martin; Tina Harris	Pete Martin	3:39
2.	"Say It Again"	Maryann Morgan; Niclas Molinder; Joacim Persson; Pelle Ankarberg	Twin; Ankarberg^{[A]}	4:08
3.	"Unnatural Blonde"	Morgan; Molinder; Persson; Ankarberg; Charlie Dore	Twin	3:11
4.	"Little Johnny"	Jany Schella; Christian Karlsson; Patrik Tucker; St. Gian; J. Aiello	Ivar Lisinski; David Clewett	4:23
5.	"Tell Me"	Molinder; Persson; Ankarberg	S. Kula	3:51
6.	"You & I"	Pablo Cepeda; Emanuel Olsson; Jeanette Olsson	Lisinski; Clewett	4:07
7.	"Sorry, You've Got the Wrong Girl"	Morgan; Molinder; Persson; Ankarberg	Twin; Ankarberg^{[A]}	2:36
8.	"One in a Million"	Toby Gad; Negin Djafari	Lisinski; Clewett	3:32
9.	"Do It All Over"	Morgan; Molinder; Persson; Ankarberg	Twin; Ankarberg^{[A]}	3:24
10.	"Better for You"	Reed Vertelney; Gordon Chambers	Lisinski; Clewett	3:25
11.	"All Eyes on You"	Molinder; Persson	Molinder; Persson	3:08
12.	"Trusted"	Mark Jaimes; Rosie Ribbons; Danny Saxon	Lisinski; Clewett	3:10
13.	"Help Me Let Go"	Pam Sheyne; Dane Deviller; Sean Hosein	Sheyne; Nigel Rush	3:56
Total length:				46:45

Notes

- ^{^[A]} denotes co-producer

== Personnel and credits ==
Credits adapted from the liner notes of Unexpected.

Musicians

- Pelle Ankarberg – strings, vocal assistance
- Camilla Brinck – vocal assistance
- David Clewett – bass guitar, vocal assistance
- Consensus Gospel Choir – vocal assistance
- Mathias Gamej – guitar
- Fredrik Landh – drums
- Joje Lindskoog – drums
- Ivar Lisinski – vocal assistance
- Celetia Martin – vocal assistance
- Anders Matthison – bass
- Maryann Morgan – vocal assistance
- Lisa Nordell – vocal assistance
- Mats Norrefalk – acoustic guitar
- Clas Oloffson – guitar
- Joacim Persson – bass, electric guitar
- P.E.T.E.R. – harmonica
- Nigel Rush – piano, rhodes
- Marc Sutton – guitar
- Twin – keyboard
- Amanda Wilson – vocal assistance

Technical

- Justin Broad – engineer, mixing
- David Cuenca – photography
- Niclas Flyckt – mixing
- Gothenburg – mixing
- Jeo – mixing
- Toby Lindell – mixing
- Pete Martin – programming
- Nigel Rush – mixing, programming
- Twin – programming
- Frank Zauritz – photography

== Charts ==
Weekly chart performance for Unexpected
Chart (2004)	Peak position
Austrian Albums (Ö3 Austria)	73
German Albums (Offizielle Top 100)	13
Swiss Albums (Schweizer Hitparade)	91
