= Unnatural Blonde =

Single by Sandy

from the album Unexpected
- Released: 21 May 2004
- Length: 3:11
- Label: Cheyenne; Polydor; Zeitgeist
- Songwriter(s): Maryann Morgan; Niclas Molinder; Joacim Persson; Pelle Ankarberg
- Producer(s): Twin

Sandy singles chronology
| "Unnatural Blonde" (2004) | "Tell Me" (2004) |

"Unnatural Blonde" is a song by German singer Sandy Mölling. It was written by Maryann Morgan, Niclas Molinder, Joacim Persson, and Pelle Ankarberg and recorded for her debut solo album Unexpected (2004), with production helmed by Moldinder and Persson under their production moniker Twin. Selected as Mölling's solo debut single following the hiatus of her former band No Angels, the uptempo pop song was released on 21 May 2004 in German-speaking Europe and became a top ten hit in Germany.

== Music video ==
"Unnatural Blonde" was directed by Christoph Mangler and Mathias Vielsaecker and produced by Blow Film.

== Track listings ==
2-Track CD single
| No. | Title | Length |
|---|---|---|
| 1. | "Unnatural Blonde" (Radio Edit) | 3:10 |
| 2. | "Unnatural Blonde" (Remix) | 3:06 |

Maxi single
| No. | Title | Length |
|---|---|---|
| 1. | "Unnatural Blonde" (Radio Edit) | 3:10 |
| 2. | "Unnatural Blonde" (Remix) | 3:06 |
| 3. | "Unnatural Blonde" (Video Edit) | 3:37 |
| 4. | "Unnatural Blonde" (Karaoke Version) | 3:10 |

== Credits and personnel ==
- Pelle Ankarberg – backing vocals
- Niklas Flyckt – mixing
- Fredrik Landh – drums
- Joje Lindskog – drums
- Sandy Mölling – vocals
- Maryann Morgan – backing vocals
- Mats Norrefalk – guitar
- Joacim Persson – bass, guitar
- Twin – production, programming

== Charts ==
Chart performance for "Unnatural Blonde"
| Chart (2004) | Peak position |
|---|---|
| Austria (Ö3 Austria Top 40) | 29 |
| Germany (GfK) | 8 |
| Switzerland (Schweizer Hitparade) | 41 |
