= Dört Dörtlük =

Studio album by Bengü
- Released: 9 June 2011
- Genre: Pop
- Length: 1:03:34
- Language: Turkish
- Label: Avrupa
- Producer: Cengiz Erdem · Deniz Erdem

Bengü chronology
İki Melek (2009)	Dört Dörtlük (2011)	İkinci Hal (2014)

Dört Dörtlük (Perfect) is the sixth studio album by Turkish singer Bengü. It was released on 9 June 2011 by Avrupa Müzik.

== Track listing ==
No.	Title	Lyrics	Music	Arrangement	Length
1.	"Aşkım" (Version 1)	Sinan Akçıl	Sinan Akçıl	Volga Tamöz	3:14
2.	"Kalbi Olan Ağlıyor"	Sinan Akçıl, Bengü	Sinan Akçıl, Omer Onder Guney, and Bengü		4:32
3.	"Saat 03:00" (Version 1)	Sinan Akçıl	Sinan Akçıl	Volga Tamöz	3:32
4.	"Cesaret"	Sinan Akçıl	Sinan Akçıl		4:37
5.	"Kalbim Affetsin" (Version 1)	Sinan Akçıl	Sinan Akçıl	Volga Tamöz	3:12
6.	"Kadar" (Version 1)	Şehrazat	Şehrazat	Volga Tamöz	5:13
7.	"Son Nokta"	Ersay Üner	Ersay Üner	Volga Tamöz	3:49
8.	"Dört Dörtlük"	Şehrazat	Şehrazat	Volga Tamöz	5:05
9.	"Veda"	Deniz Erten	Bengü	Volga Tamöz	4:30
10.	"Çetele" (Version 1)	Oytun Karanacak	Oytun Karanacak	Volga Tamöz	4:42
11.	"Aşkım" (Version 2)	Sinan Akçıl	Sinan Akçıl	Ozan Çolakoğlu	3:34
12.	"Kadar" (Version 2)	Şehrazat	Şehrazat	Volga Tamöz	3:56
13.	"Kalbim Affetsin" (Version 2)	Sinan Akçıl	Sinan Akçıl	Erhan Bayrak	4:41
14.	"Saat 03.00" (Version 2)	Sinan Akçıl	Sinan Akçıl	Erhan Bayrak	4:34
15.	"Çetele" (Version 2)	Oytun Karanacak	Oytun Karanacak	Volga Tamöz	4:10
Total length:					1:03:34

== Charts ==
Album	Song	Peak
Album	Song	Turkey
Dört Dörtlük	"Aşkım"	2
Dört Dörtlük	"Saat 03:00"	4

== Sales ==
Country	Sales
Turkey (MÜ-YAP)	25,000
