= Tell Me (Sandy Mölling song) =

Single by Sandy

from the album Unexpected
- Released: 23 August 2004
- Length: 3:51
- Label: Cheyenne; Universal
- Songwriter(s): Niclas Molinder; Joacim Persson; Pelle Ankarberg
- Producer(s): S. Kula

Sandy singles chronology
"Unnatural Blonde" (2004)	"Tell Me" (2004)	"Unexpected" (2005)

"Tell Me" is a song by German singer Sandy. Written by frequent contributors Niclas Molinder, Joacim Persson, and Pelle Ankarberg from Swedish production team Twin, the pop ballad was recorded for her debut solo album, Unexpected (2004). Production was helmed by Stefan Kuhla under his pseudonym S. Kula. Released as the album's second single, "Tell Me" reached number 10 on the German Singles Chart, becoming Sandy's second consecutive top ten entry. A different version, chiefly produced by Twin, was recorded by Swedish singer Charlotte Perrelli for her third album Gone Too Long, also released in 2004.

== Music video ==
A music video for "Tell Me" was directed by Niels Laupert and produced by Pop-House. It was filmed on various locations throughout Gran Canaria, the third-largest and second-most-populous island of the Canary Islands.

== Track listings ==
2-Track CD single
No.	Title	Length
1.	"Tell Me" (Radio/Video-Edit)	3:51
2.	"Tell Me" (Dance Remix)	4:02

Maxi single
No.	Title	Length
1.	"Tell Me" (Radio/Video-Edit)	3:51
2.	"Tell Me" (Dance Remix)	4:02
3.	"Tell Me" (Acoustic Mix)	3:51
4.	"Tell Me" (Karaoke Version)	3:51
5.	"Tell Me" (Music video)	3:51

== Credits and personnel ==
- Pelle Ankarberg – writer
- Jeo – mixing
- S. Kula – production, arrangement
- Joje Lindskog – drums
- Niclas Molinder – writer
- Sandy Mölling – vocals
- Joacim Persson – writer

== Charts ==
Chart performance for "Tell Me"
Chart (2004)	Peak position
Austria (Ö3 Austria Top 40)	34
Germany (GfK)	10
Switzerland (Schweizer Hitparade)	46
