= Single Girl =

Single by Sandy Posey

from the album Single Girl
- B-side: "Blue Is My Best Color"
- Released: 1966
- Recorded: August 19, 1966
- Studio: Fred Foster Sound Studio, Nashville, Tennessee
- Genre: Pop
- Length: 2:27
- Label: MGM Records
- Songwriter: Martha Sharp
- Producer: Chips Moman

Sandy Posey singles chronology
"Born a Woman" (1966)	"Single Girl" (1966)	"What a Woman in Love Won't Do" (1967)

"Single Girl" is a song written by Martha Sharp. It was an international hit for American singer Sandy Posey from late 1966 to early 1967.

== The song ==
Like Born a Woman, which was also written by Martha Sharp, Single Girl contained some sentiments that were ostensibly skeptical of men (for example, "I know all about men and their lies"). But whereas Born a Woman was seen by some as having feminist overtones, Single Girl was essentially more traditional in outlook—a young, isolated woman anticipating that "some day", despite not knowing anybody, people being "phoney" and the nights getting "so lonely", she would find waiting for her a man to "lean on". As one later commentator put it, drawing a contrast with Julie Rogers' The Wedding (1964), "Single Girl... touched a nerve with every 'wallflower' who possessed a record player".

The score of Single Girl was notable for its gradual crescendo towards the end and a piano backing that, between the closing lines,

Someday I’ll have a sweet loving man to lean on
The single girl needs a sweet loving man to lean on,

contained two distinctive high notes that were apt to linger in the mind of the listener. Billboard described Single Girl as "a strong piece of ballad material with driving rhythm background". The production overall conveyed very well the sense that "to make it in pop music in the 1960s, a girl needed a really strong song and a strong production, as well as a lot of tenacity and dogged determination".

== Recording by Sandy Posey (1966) ==
Sandy Posey recorded "Single Girl" at the Fred Foster Sound Studio in Nashville, Tennessee on August 19, 1966. Although not strictly a country song, her rendition gave it a country feel – a style that some years later was often referred to as "countrypolitan".

"Single Girl" was produced by "Chips" Moman and released by MGM, reaching number 12 in the US sales charts in January 1967 and number 15 in Britain. It was re-released in 1975, and it entered the British top 50 again. and, as Posey's signature song, appeared on a number of compilations, including a Posey retrospective, A Single Girl: The Very Best of the MGM Recordings, in 2002. The sleeve notes for the latter drew on an interview with Posey about her time at MGM.

=== Charts ===
Chart (1966–67)	Peak position
Australia (Go-Set)	5
Canada Top Singles (RPM)	5
New Zealand (Listener Chart)	5
UK Singles (Official Charts)	15
US Billboard Hot 100	12

== Other versions ==
- An Italian version, "Sempre Solo," recorded in Milan, was coupled with "Nata Donna," Posey's first hit single, known in English as "Born a Woman.".
- In the late 1960s, a Chinese cover version, titled 獨身女, was recorded by Singaporean-Chinese singer Ling Yun (singer) (凌雲, also known as Rita Chao).
- A French version, "Drôle de fille" was recorded by Sylvie Vartan on the album 2'35 de bonheur in 1967.
- In 1968, Belgian singer Liliane Saint-Pierre reached number 37 in the Belgian charts with her French adaptation "Je suis une fille toute seule".
- Martha Sharp recorded her own version of "Single Girl" for an album in 1973.
- In 1997, South African singer Patricia Lewis (singer) recorded Single Girl for her debut album "Ek Is Lief Vir Jou"
- In 2012 the English indie band the Primitives released a slightly more up-tempo recording, featuring their lead singer Tracy Cattell (known as Tracy Tracy), on their album Echoes and Rhymes.
