= All Hung Up in Your Green Eyes =

Single by Sandy Posey
- A-side: "Your Conception of Love"
- Released: 1968
- Genre: Pop, Easy listening
- Length: 3:37
- Label: MGM
- Songwriter(s): Sandy Posey

"All Hung Up in Your Green Eyes" is a popular song composed and performed by Sandy Posey. In 1968, it was released as the reverse side of MGM 45 rpm record "Your Conception of Love". In the same year it was covered by Şehrazat in Turkish ("İki Gölge").
