= İkinci Hal =

Studio album by Bengü
- Released: 17 October 2014
- Genre: Pop, Alaturka
- Length: 42:01
- Label: DMC, BNG Müzik

Bengü chronology
Dört Dörtlük (2011)	İkinci Hal (2014)	Altın Çağ (2017)

İkinci Hal (The Latter State) is the seventh studio album by Turkish singer Bengü. It was released by DMC on 17 October 2014. It features notable pieces by Mustafa Ceceli, Erdem Kinay and Şehrazat, and vocals by Emre Aydın on the song "Kadar". The album's lead single "Sahici", written by Zeki Güner, became a number-one hit on the charts and the song "Feveran" was one of the huge hits during the summer of 2015.

== Critical reception ==
The reception of İkinci Hal was rather good and people enjoyed the musical change of Bengü's sound. LoneReviewer website praised Bengü's professionalism and the production of chartbusters "Sahici" and "Feveran" but criticized lack of coherence and weakness of some compositions.

== Track listing ==
No.	Title	Writer(s)	Composer(s)	Length
1.	"Sahici"	Zeki Güner	Mustafa Ceceli	3:27
2.	"İkinci Hal"	Zeki Güner	Ebru Elver	4:14
3.	"Hilal"	Zeki Güner	Murat Yeter	3:40
4.	"Kapıda Yalnızlık"	Zeki Güner	Mustafa Ceceli	2:53
5.	"Ege"	Zeki Güner	Serkan Kavuşan	3:50
6.	"Yaprak Dökümü"	Serkan Kavuşan	Serkan Kavuşan	3:47
7.	"Kadar" (feat. Emre Aydın)	Şehrazat	Şehrazat	4:07
8.	"Feveran"	Deniz Erten	Erdem Kınay	3:25
9.	"İkinci Hal" (Barış Özesener Version)	Zeki Güner	Ebru Elver	4:18
10.	"Saygımdan"	Zeki Güner	Zeki Güner	4:31
11.	"Yaralı"	Zeki Güner	Zeki Güner	3:49
Total length:				42:01

== Sales ==
Country	Sales
Turkey (MÜ-YAP)	18,000
