= Nil Burak =

Turkish musical artist (born 1948)

- Born: Pembe Nihal Munsif; 27 April 1948 (age 78); Lefka, Cyprus
- Origin: Turkish Cypriot
- Genres: Pop
- Occupations: Singer, songwriter, actress
- Years active: 1975–present
- Label: Raks
- Website: Official website

Pembe Nihal Munsif (born 27 April 1948), better known as Nil Burak, is a Turkish Cypriot pop singer and actress who is famous in Turkey and Northern Cyprus.

== Biography ==
She was born in Lefka, Cyprus in 1948. She is best known for her hit song Sen de Başını Alıp Gitme ("Don't you run away, too"). Nil Burak is also the winner of 1985 Medifestival from Turkey with Güneş Bir Kere Doğdu ("The sun rose once"). She currently resides in Istanbul, Turkey.

== Discography ==
=== 45 RPM ===
- Ben Anlamam / Seni İyi Tanırım, ("I don't Understand / I Recognize You Well") (Atlas-1975)
- Bir Eski Şarkı / Birisine Birisine, ("An Old Song / I Fell in Love with Somebody") (Atlas-1975)
- Canıma Değsin - Ya Mustafa, ("It Serves Him Right / Ho Mustafa") (Atlas-1975)
- Sus / Tatlı Tatlı, ("Shut Up / Sweet Sweet") (Atlas-1975)
- Dünyamı Yıktı Geçti / Kırk Yılda Bir, ("He Harried My World / Once in a Lifetime") (Yavuz-1977)
- Gözünüz Aydın / Yalnızım Ben, ("I'm Happy for You / I'm Alone") (Yavuz-1978)

=== Albums (LP/MC/CD) ===
- Nil Burak (1977), (Atlas-1977)
- Benim Adım Şarkıcı ("My Name is Singer"), (Yavuz-1979)
- İki Elim Yakanda ("My Hands are on Your Collar"), Boş Vere Boş Vere ("Nevermind Nevermind") (Kervan-1980)
- Bizim Diyar ("Our Land"), (Kervan-1981)
- Benim Sevdam ("My Love"), (Yaşar-1984)
- Zurna Kazım ("Shrill Pipe Kazim"), (Göksoy-1988)
- Oldu Olacak ("That was Close"), (Bayar-1989)
- İşte Banko! ("Here is Bank!"), (Raks-1992)
- Nil Burak'95 Akdeniz Rüzgarı ("Nil Burak'95 Mediterranean Wind"), (Göksoy-1995)
- En İyileriyle Nil Burak (1975-1985) (Best of Nil Burak (1975–1985)), (Ossi-2008)
- Bir Numaramsın ("You're My Number One"), (Ossi-2008)
- Mavi 2012 ("Blue 2012"), (Ossi-2012)

== Filmography ==
- Gülşah ("Gulsah"), (Gülşah Film, 1975)
- Eksik Etek ("Petticoat"), (Film-iş, 1976)
- Merhaba Tatlım (Barış Film-1976)
- Doğru Yoldan Ayrılanlar ("People Who Leave The Right Way"),
- Çalıkuşu ("The Wren"), (TRT, 1986)
- Kaldırım Çiçeği ("Sidewalk Flower"), (Ulusal TV & Erler Film, 1996)
- Avrupa Yakası (ATV, 2008)

== Music videos ==
- Birisine Birisine on YouTube
- Boş Vere Boş Vere on YouTube
- Bizim Diyar on YouTube
- Bir Kadın on YouTube
- Sen de Başını Alıp Gitme on YouTube
- Güneş Bir Kere Doğdu on YouTube

== See also ==
- List of Turkish pop music performers

== Additional sources ==
- http://www.ossimuzik.com/nilburakcift.php
- http://turkpopmuzik.net/
- http://www.birzamanlar.net/
- http://www.aksam.com.tr/haber.asp?a=106356,105
