= Altın Çağ =

Studio album by Bengü
- Released: 31 May 2017
- Genre: Pop
- Length: 38:40
- Label: DMC, Felix

Bengü chronology
İkinci Hal (2014)	Altın Çağ (2017)

Altın Çağ (Golden Age) is the eighth studio album by Turkish singer Bengü. It was released on 31 May 2017 by DMC and contains 11 songs in total. The album's lead single "Kuzum", written by Ayla Çelik, was released together with a music video on 24 May 2017 and subsequently ranked second on the MusicTopTR Official List. The album's third music video was prepared for the song "Geçmiş Olsun", which entered the MusicTopTR Official List and ranked seventh.

== Track listing ==
No.	Title	Writer(s)	Composer(s)	Length
1.	"Empati" (feat. Volga Tamöz)	Bengü	Volga Tamöz	2:55
2.	"Kuzum"	Ayla Çelik	Gökhan Tepe	3:06
3.	"Yalelli"	Murat Güneş	Volga Tamöz	3:01
4.	"Altın Çağ"	Murat Güneş	Volga Tamöz	3:17
5.	"Deli Dumrul"	Esin İris	Volga Tamöz	4:38
6.	"Neden"	Özlem Melda Gürbey	Özlem Melda Gürbey	2:54
7.	"Geçmiş Olsun"	Özlem Melda Gürbey	Özlem Melda Gürbey	3:08
8.	"Telaş"	Bengü	Bengü	3:42
9.	"Sanki" (feat. Hakan Altun)	Doğukan Yiğit Medetoğlu	Doğukan Yiğit Medetoğlu	4:00
10.	"Bahane"	Ercan Savtekin	Ercan Savtekin	4:15
11.	"Sözünde Durmadın"	Ercan Savtekin	Ercan Savtekin	3:48
Total length:				38:40

== Release history ==
Country	Date	Format(s)	Label
Turkey	31 May 2017	CD · digital download	DMC, Felix
Worldwide	31 May 2017	Digital download	DMC, Felix
