= Yıldız Kaplan =

Turkish actress, singer and model

Yıldız Kaplan (born October 28, 1970, Bafra, Turkey) is a Turkish actress, fashion model, and pop singer.

== Biography ==
She was born in Bafra, Samsun Province in 1970. Although she is mainly a model and singer, she has also acted in a number of films and TV series.

== Discography ==
- Gönül Borcu (2002) (September 10, 2002)
- Işıl Işıl (2005) (June 10, 2005)
- Motive (2008) (July 11, 2008)
- Aşk Dili (2011) (May 27, 2011)

== Filmography ==
- Yapma Diyorum (2009)
- Evli ve Çocuklu (2004)
- İnşaat (2003)
- Evli ve Çocuklu TV (2003)
- Asayiş Berkemal (2002)
- Bizim Otel (2001)
- Hemşo (2000)
- Parça Pinçik (2000)
- Unutabilsem (1998)
- Yasemin (1997)
- Tatlı Kaçıklar TV (1997)
