= Galore (The Primitives album) =

Studio album by The Primitives
- Released: 1991
- Genre: Indie pop
- Length: 40:55
- Label: RCA
- Producer: Ian Broudie, Ed Buller, Paul Sampson, The Primitives

The Primitives chronology
Pure (1989)	Galore (1991)	Echoes and Rhymes (2012)

Singles from Galore
- 1. "You Are the Way" Released: 1991; 2. "Earth Thing" Released: 1991; 3. "Lead Me Astray" Released: 1992

Galore is the third studio album by the British band The Primitives, released in autumn 1991. It was not released in the UK until 13 April 1992. It was the final album recorded by the group in their first existence, as they disbanded shortly after this release. They would not record again until 2010, and would not release another album until 2012's Echoes and Rhymes.

Galore was reissued in an expanded double-CD edition by Cherry Red Records in January 2015.

== Reception ==
Professional ratings
Review scores
Source	Rating
AllMusic	3.5/5 stars
Record Collector	3/5 stars

In a retrospective review, Jake Kennedy of Record Collector said he would "love to pronounce it the overlooked gem" of the band's career "but, in truth, it's muddled by a mix of producers". He added that it is unsuccessful in "shak[ing] off the baggage and tiredness that originally signposted it as an endpoint" in their career.

== Track listing ==
All tracks composed by Paul "PJ" Court; except where indicated

1. "You Are the Way" (Court, Ian Broudie) – 3:32
2. "Lead Me Astray" – 3:16
3. "Earth Thing" – 4:20
4. "Give This World to You" – 4:04
5. "Slip Away" – 2:24
6. "Cold Enough to Kill" – 4:41
7. "Hello Jesus" – 2:16
8. "Empathise" – 4:07
9. "See Thru the Dark" – 2:59
10. "Kiss Mine" – 3:31
11. "Smile" – 2:36
12. "The Little Black Egg" (Michael Stone) – 3:09

== Personnel ==
- Tracy Tracy – lead vocals, tambourine
- Paul Court – guitar, vocals
- Tig Williams – drums
- Anthony Harty – bass
- Neil Champion – bass
