= Bowi =

EP by Nick Lowe
- Released: 1977
- Genre: Rock
- Label: Stiff
- Producer: Nick Lowe

Nick Lowe chronology
Bowi (1977)	Nick Lowe & Dave Edmunds Sing The Everly Brothers (1980)

Professional ratings
Review scores
Source	Rating
Allmusic	4.5/5.0 stars

Bowi was the first EP released on Stiff Records. Recorded by Nick Lowe, who had also released the first Stiff single, the title and cover were intended as a humorous response to the David Bowie album Low, which had been released earlier in the year. Lowe decided that as Bowie had made an album with his name, but without the final e, he would reciprocate by making a record with Bowie's name, also lacking the final e.

Of the four tracks on the EP, only "Marie Provost" was initially re-released on an album, 1978's Jesus of Cool (issued as Pure Pop for Now People in the US), although all four tracks appear on the 2008 deluxe re-release edition of Jesus of Cool.

The opening track "Born a Woman", written by Martha Sharp, had previously been performed by Sandy Posey "as a lament about the world's cruelty and inequality", whereas Lowe sings it with glee, unclear whether he is "decrying the information he's sharing or reveling in it".

"Marie Provost" was written about the death of silent screen star Marie Prevost, whose body was discovered several days after she had died, alone and penniless in her Hollywood apartment. When she was found, she had bite marks on her legs, courtesy of her dog. That was the basis for the refrain, "She was a winner / that became the doggie's dinner", as well as other lines indicating that her pet dachshund had eaten her. In contrast to the sad content of the lyrics, which evoke the transitory nature of fame, the melody is deliberately "bouncy ... with chiming guitars".

The cover photography was by Peter Gravelle.

== Track listing ==
All songs written by Nick Lowe, except "Born a Woman" by Martha Sharpe.

1. "Born a Woman" (originally performed by Sandy Posey)
2. "Shake That Rat"
3. "Marie Provost"
4. "Endless Sleep"
