= Pure (The Primitives album) =

Studio album by The Primitives
- Released: 1989
- Genre: Indie pop
- Length: 45:49
- Label: RCA
- Producers: Paul Sampson, Wayne Morris

The Primitives chronology
Lovely (1988)	Pure (1989)	Galore (1991)

Singles from Pure
- 1. "Way Behind Me" Released: 1988; 2. "Sick of It" Released: 1989; 3. "Secrets" Released: 1989; 4. "All the Way Down" Released: 1990 (US promo only release)

Professional ratings
Review scores
Source	Rating
Allmusic	3.5/5 stars
Record Mirror	2.5/5 stars

Pure is the second studio album by the British band The Primitives, released in 1989 as the follow-up to their debut, Lovely. The line-up changed slightly over the course of the previous year: Steve Dullaghan was replaced on the bass guitar by Paul Sampson, who also shared the production duties with Wayne Morris.

The first U.S. single from Pure was "Sick of It", which reached #24 in the UK. Pure also features "Way Behind Me", a single which was actually released shortly after the debut album (rising to #36 on the UK charts in 1988) and added to all future editions of Lovely. "Secrets" was also released as a single; however it stalled just inside the Top 50 (#49 UK). "I'll Be Your Mirror" is a cover of a Velvet Underground song from 1967.

== Critical reception ==
In 2004, Ned Raggett of Freaky Trigger described Pure as "brilliant still, a futzing around of their Blondie/JAMC/'pure pop' template".

== Track listing ==
All songs written by Paul "PJ" Court unless indicated otherwise.

1. "Outside" – 1:54
2. "Summer Rain" – 3:09
3. "Sick of It" – 3:11
4. "Shine" – 3:53
5. "Dizzy Heights" – 2:35
6. "All the Way Down" (Court, Tracy, Dullaghan) – 3:35
7. "Secrets" – 2:29
8. "Keep Me in Mind" – 2:35
9. "Lonely Streets" – 2:18
10. "Can't Bring Me Down" – 2:37
11. "Way Behind Me" (Court, Tracy) – 3:08
12. "Never Tell" – 2:53
13. "Noose" – 3:27
14. "I'll Be Your Mirror" (Lou Reed) – 2:41
15. "All the Way Down (Beat Version)" (Court, Tracy) – 2:21
16. "I Almost Touched You" – 2:40

== Personnel ==
- Tracy Tracy – lead vocals, tambourine
- Paul Court – guitar, vocals
- Tig Williams – drums
- Paul Sampson – bass

== Chart performance ==
The album reached No. 36 on the UK album charts. It spent 15 weeks on the U.S. Billboard 200 album charts and reached its peak position of No. 113 in February 1990.
