= Lovely (The Primitives album) =

Studio album by the Primitives
- Released: March 1988
- Recorded: 1987–1988
- Genre: Psychedelic pop
- Length: 35:25
- Label: RCA
- Producers: Paul Sampson; Mark Wallis; Craig Leon

The Primitives chronology
Lovely (1988)	Pure (1989)

Lovely is the debut studio album by the English indie pop band the Primitives, released in March 1988 by RCA Records. It features the international hit single "Crash", as well as the UK top 100 hits "Stop Killing Me", "Thru the Flowers", and "Out of Reach". "Way Behind Me" was issued as a single after the album's initial release and was later included on re-releases as well as on the follow-up studio album Pure (1989).

== Chart performance ==
The album reached No. 6 on the UK Albums Chart. It spent 9 weeks on the US Billboard 200 album charts and reached its peak position of No. 106 in October 1988.

== Critical reception ==
Professional ratings
Review scores
Source	Rating
AllMusic	4/5 stars
NME	8/10
Record Collector	5/5 stars
Rolling Stone	3/5 stars
The Rolling Stone Album Guide	3/5 stars

The Globe and Mail stated that "Tracy Tracy's sweet vocals bring a touch of light and melody to Paul Courts' distortion-tinged bubblegum psychedelia."

== Track listing ==
All songs written by Paul "PJ" Court, except for where noted.

1. "Crash" (Court, Steve Dullaghan, Tracy Tracy) – 2:31
2. "Spacehead" (Court, Dullaghan, Tracy) – 2:11
3. "Carry Me Home" – 2:54
4. "Shadow" (Court, Dullaghan, Tracy) – 3:28
5. "Thru the Flowers" – 2:30
6. "Dreamwalk Baby" – 2:01
7. "I'll Stick with You" – 2:33
8. "Way Behind Me" (Court, Tracy) [bonus track; not on original release] – 3:08
9. "Nothing Left" (Court, Dullaghan, Tracy) – 3:04
10. "Stop Killing Me" – 2:04
11. "Out of Reach" – 2:20
12. "Ocean Blue" – 3:24
13. "Run Baby Run" – 2:32
14. "Don't Want Anything to Change" – 1:52
15. "Buzz Buzz Buzz" – 2:01

== Personnel ==
- Tracy Tracy – lead vocals, tambourine
- Paul Court – guitar, vocals
- Steve Dullaghan – bass
- Tig Williams – drums
