= Bengü =

Turkish singer (born 1979)

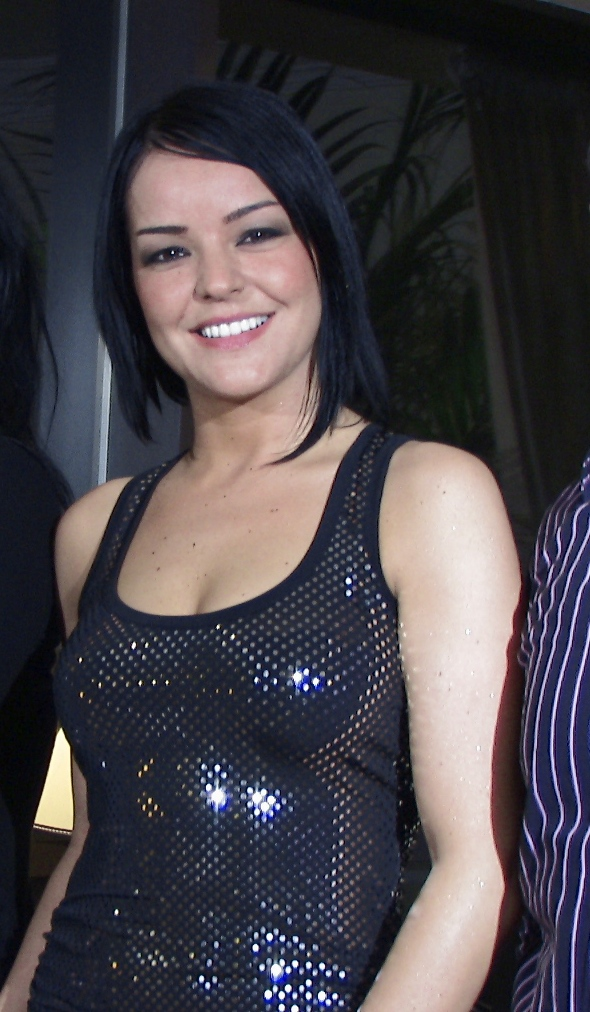
- Bengü in 2008
- Born: Bengü Erden; 2 April 1979 (age 47); İzmir, Turkey
- Occupations: Singer; songwriter
- Spouse: Selim Selimoğlu (m. 2018; div. 2024)
- Children: 2
- Musical career
- Genres: Pop
- Instrument: Vocals
- Years active: 2000–present
- Labels: Kiss Müzik; DSM; Erol Köse; Avrupa; DMC
- Website: www.bengu.com.tr

Bengü Erden (born 2 April 1979) is a Turkish singer. She became first familiar with music during her time at the İzmir State Symphony Orchestra. In İzmir, she was cast in a leading role in the musical "Oliver Twist". She later took singing lessons with İzmir State Conservatory's general manager, Müfit Bayraş. In 1998, by performing a song by Müfit Bayşara, she ranked second at the competition Pop Show '98, organized by Mü-Yap and Show TV. She then studied music at Istanbul Academy. She worked as a backing vocalist for Kenan Doğulu for three years. In 2007, Bengü became the winner of Show TV's singing competition Bak Kim Dans Ediyor. Her first album, Hoş Geldin, was produced by Kenan Doğulu and Ozan Doğulu and released in July 2000. Her second studio album, Bağlasan Durmam, was released in 2005. After two years, she released her third studio album, Taktik. With the song "Korkma Kalbim" from this album, she received a digital certification from Mü-Yap and the album became one of the best-selling albums of the year.

In 2009, Bengü released İki Melek. The album sold 125,000 copies and received a gold certification. By ranking number-one on Türkçe Top 20 for seven weeks, she became one of 2009's Turkish artists who topped the music charts for a long period of time. In 2011, she released the album Dört Dörtlük. With its lead single, "Aşkım", she succeeded in attracting the attention of fans and critics. The song was the most-searched song on Google in Turkey in 2011. In the same year, Bengü became the "most followed artist" in Turkey. In 2012, her maxi single "Anlatacaklarım Var" was released. The song "Yaralı" form this maxi single ranked number-one on Turkey's official music charts for seven weeks. Her 2013 single "Saygımdan" also topped 'Türkçe Top 20' in 2014 for five weeks. In 2014, Bengü's single "Yaralı" won the "Most Played Song" award at the Turkey Music Awards.

Bengü's seventh studio album, İkinci Hal, was released in October 2014. Its lead single, "Sahici", ranked third on Türkçe Top 20 and then remained number-one for five weeks. By topping the official music charts in Turkey for 10 weeks, she became 2014's second artist with the most number of number-one singles. According to TelifMetre, Bengü was 2014's Turkish female artist with the most number of streams on TV. Her other song from İkinci Hal, titled "Feveran", became successful on digital platforms and received a gold certification from DMC.

From 2000, many of her songs, including "Korkumdan Ağladım", "Korkma Kalbim", "Unut Beni", "Ağla Kalbim", "Gezegen", "İki Melek", "Kocaman Öpüyorum", "Aşkım", "Saat 03:00", "Haberin Olsun", "Yaralı", "Saygımdan", "Sahici", "Feveran", "Hodri Meydan" and "Sığamıyorum" have become hits. To this day she has released eight studio albums and six singles and has received various awards and nominations for her works. Among her nominations are four Turkey Music Awards and two Balkan Music Awards. She has also won one Turkey Music Award, one Mü-Yap Music Award and one TTNET Music Award.

== Career ==
=== 2000–2008: Hoş Geldin, Bağlasan Durmam, Taktik and Gezegen ===
Bengü's first album, Hoş Geldin, was released in July 2000 after a preparation process of about three and a half years. Kenan Doğulu, Şehrazat, Ümit Sayın, and Yıldız Tilbe were among the musicians who helped with its preparations. It featured nine songs and one remix. All of the songs were composed by Ozan Doğulu. Cihan Okan and Sıla were the vocalists whose voice was featured on the album. All the photographs for the album were shot by Koray Kasap. Bengü performed at nearly 300 concerts both inside and outside of the country with this album.

Bengü's main breakthrough came in 2005 with the release of her second studio album, Bağlasan Durmam. After 5 years of searching, she signed a contract with Dokuz Sekiz Müzik and under Suat Aydoğan's direction, she collaborated with Serdar Ortaç, Gökhan Şahin, Sibel Alaş and Hakkı Yalçın on this new album. The songs "Korkumdan Ağladım", "Gel Gel", "Ciddi Ciddi" were written and composed by Bengü herself, and alongside the songs "Müjde" and "Bağlasan Durmam", they were all turned into music videos. At the Turkey Music Awards, she was nominated for the "Best Female Pop Singer" award. The album Bağlasan Durmam became one of the best-selling albums of the year and sold 52,000 copies by the end of the year. NTV chose Bağlasan Durmam as one 2000's best Turkish albums.

In 2007, the album Taktik took Bengü's career into another level. The likes of Serdar Ortaç, Adnan Fırat, Kutsi, Alper Narman, and Fettah Can worked on it. Bengü also included the song "Yolcu", which she had written and composed herself, in the album. The first music video form the album was "Korkma Kalbim", written by Serdar Ortaç and composed by Suat Aydoğan. It eventually became a massive hit inside Turkey. With its success, the song received a digital certification from Mü-Yap. With 136,430 downloads, it became 2007's 13th most downloaded song. The second song that was turned into a music video was "Unut Beni", written by Adnan Fırat. It also achieved great success. The song "Ağla Kalbim", which was featured beforehand as a demo on Hande Yener's album, met special interest from the fans and was used on the soundtrack of the popular series Doktorlar. Despite lacking a music video, it has become one of the classic works of Turkish popular music. Taktik sold 100,000 copies and became one of the best-selling albums of the year.

In 2008, she released her fourth studio album, Gezegen, which received positive comments from fans and critics. The works of Serdar Ortaç, Adnan Fırat, Altan Çetin and İlhan Şeşen were featured on this album. The first music video for this album was released for the song "Gezegen", written by Serdar Ortaç and composed by Suat Aydoğan. It was directed by Murat Küçük. The song was chosen by critics, radio programs and DJs as one of the best songs of 2008. Her appearance as sexy girl wandering in the desert and taking revenge on her man in the music video was discussed in the tabloids for a long time. The album sold 35,000 copies by the end of the year.

=== 2009–2012: İki Melek, Dört Dörtlük and "Anlatacaklarım Var" ===
In 2009, her fifth studio album, İki Melek, was released by Avrupa Müzik. Serdar Ortaç, Şehrazat, Sinan Akçıl and Yalın were among the artists who worked on the album. One of the best albums of the year, its songs "İki Melek" and "Kocaman Öpüyorum" ranked number-one on Billboard Türkiye and topped the charts for 7 weeks. In 2009, she won the "Best Female Pop Artists" award at the 13th Istanbul FM Music Awards. In the same year, Siyaset Magazine Awards named her the "Singer of the Year" and her album was chosen as the "Album of the Year" by many organizations and universities. İki Melek ranked 6th on Hürriyet list of "2009's Top 20 Albums". The album sold 125,000 copied by the end of the year and earned Bengü a gold certification.

In summer of 2010, her new maxi single, "Sırada Sen Varsın", was released. For this song, Bengü won the "Best Single" award at the 14th Istanbul FM Golden Awards. Within 25 days of its release, the single sold 40,000 copies and made a huge contribution to Bengü's career.

In early 2011, Bengü was featured on Suat Ateşdağlı's album and performed the song "Artık Sevmeyeceğim". For her own 2011 album, titled Dört Dörtlük, she worked with the likes of Sinan Akçıl, Şehrazat, and Ersay Üner. Its lead single, "Aşkım", received great acclaim. It went on Twitter's trends list in Turkey. With the success of "Aşkım", Bengü became the most searched artist and singer of the year on Google in Turkey in 2011. Before the release of the second video from Dört Dörtlük, "Saat 03:00", many promo photos were released, which were met with great interest. Bengü chose "Kalbi Olan Ağlıyor", written by Sinan Akçıl, as the third song from the album to be turned into a music video by director Salih Singin. According to Mü-Yap, by the end of the year the album sold 25,000 copies.

In the final months of 2012 Bengü released "Anlatacaklarım Var". She finished her work with Avrupa Müzik, and started her own production company known as BNG Müzik. At the same time, she signed a new contract with DMC. The single featured two songs by Zeki Güner: "Haberin Olsun" and "Yaralı". With the inclusion of different versions for the two songs, a total of seven songs arranged by Mustafa Ceceli were released. "Haberin Olsun" was turned into a music video by Nihat Odabaşı. The second song to become a music video was "Yaralı". In the summer months, "Yaralı" topped Türkçe Top 20 for seven weeks and became the third-most streamed song of the year. The single was chosen as the "Best Single" at the 19th Siyaset Magazine Awards. "Yaralı" also earned the "Most Played Song of 2014" award at the Turkey Music Awards.

=== 2013–2016: "Saygımdan", İkinci Hal, "Hodri Meydan" and "Sığamıyorum" ===
After the success of "Yaralı", which topped Türkçe Top 20 for seven weeks, Bengü started to work on a new single. In November 2013, she released the single "Saygımdan", which was well received by fans and critics. The song was written by Zeki Güner and composed by Mustafa Ceceli. Its music video was directed by Burak Ertaş. It was produced by her own company BNG Müzik and DMC. At the final weeks of 2013, the song ranked second on Turkey's official music charts and at the beginning of 2014 it topped the charts for five weeks. It was included in most radio and TV's top lists. Due to the success of "Saygımdan" and "Yaralı", Bengü was nominated for the "Best Female Artist" award at the Turkey Music Awards.

For the album İkinci Hal, she worked with Deniz Erten and Serkan Kavuşan, who wrote the songs, and Murat Yeter, Barış Özesener, Erdem Kınay and Çağatay Şen, who arranged and composed them. The album also features Bengü's song "Kadar" from her 2011 album, Dört Dörtlük. It was turned into a duet with Emre Aydın as a new version. Bengü also included the singles "Yaralı" and "Saygımdan", which had previously earned her numerous awards and nominations, in the album as well. The album ranked among the top 5 on the list of best-selling albums. TTNET Müzik also chose it as the "Album of the Year".

"Hodri Meydan", Bengü's fifth single, was released on 4 March 2016 by DMC. It was written by Deniz Erten and composed by Toylan Kaya, while Erdem Kınay arranged it. It was released on digital platforms on 7 March. Actress Demet Özdemir appears in the music video for the song. The music video was shot in an old cable factory in the Ümraniye plateaus and in five different places. It was directed by Gülşen Aybaba. On its first week of release, it ranked number-one on TTNET Müzik's list of 100 Most Played Songs. It was also released in the form of CD on 25 March and, on its first week, topped D&R's list of best songs. It also became the number-one song on many radio and music channels.

Another single, "Sığamıyorum", was released on 28 June on digital platforms and as a music video on YouTube. It was written by Zeki Güner and arranged by Mustafa Ceceli. The video garnered 5 million views on its first week of release. After three weeks, the song ranked third on Turkey's official music charts.

=== 2017–present: Altın Çağ and "Yazık" ===
Bengü's eighth studio album, Altın Çağ, was released by DMC on 31 May 2017. The songs "Kuzum", "Sanki", "Geçmiş Olsun", and "Altın Çağ" were the pieces from this album for which separate music videos were released.

Her new single, "Yazık", was released on 15 February 2019 together with a music video directed by Elif Demiralp. The lyrics of the song were written by Ersay Üner and Volga Tamöz served as the arranger for the single. In the same year, she collaborated with Bilal Sonses on the song "İçimden Gelmiyor", which was released as a duet together with a music video in April 2019. By the end of November 2019, Bengü's new single "Günaydın" was released by DMC. Its music video was directed by Ulaş Elgin and the song itself was written and composed by Melda Gürbey.

== Discography ==
- Hoş Geldin (2000)
- Bağlasan Durmam (2005)
- Taktik (2007)
- Gezegen (2008)
- İki Melek (2009)
- Dört Dörtlük (2011)
- İkinci Hal (2014)
- Altın Çağ (2017)

== Television ==
Year	Program	Role
2005	Müzik Kutusu	Presenter
2007	Elifnağme	Presenter
2015	Kapışma	Judge
