= Sandy Posey =

American popular singer (1944–2024)

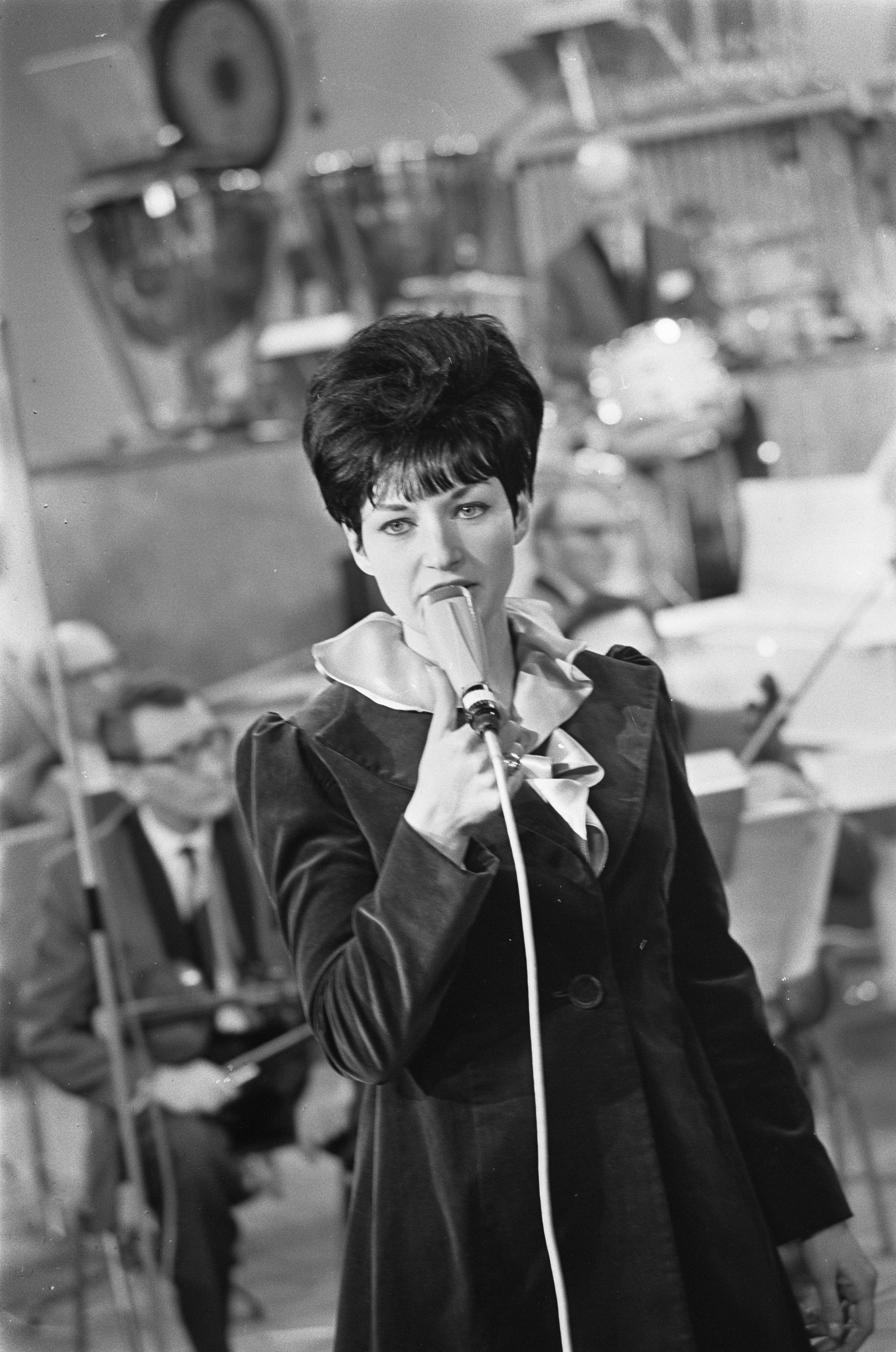
- Posey in 1968

Background information
- Born: June 18, 1944; Jasper, Alabama, U.S.
- Died: July 20, 2024 (aged 80) Lebanon, Tennessee, U.S.
- Genres: Pop, country, gospel
- Occupation: Singer
- Years active: 1965–2007
- Labels: MGM, Columbia, Warner Bros., King, Crossworlds Entertainment

Sandra Lou Posey (June 18, 1944 – July 20, 2024) was an American popular singer who enjoyed success in the 1960s with singles such as her 1966 recording of Martha Sharp's compositions "Born a Woman" and "Single Girl". She was often described as a country singer, although, like Skeeter Davis (to whom she has been frequently compared), her output varied. Later in her career, the term "countrypolitan", associated with the "Nashville sound", was sometimes applied. Posey had four hit singles in the United States, three of which peaked at number 12 on the Hot 100.

== Early life and session singer career ==
Posey was born in Jasper, Alabama, on June 18, 1944. She graduated from high school in West Memphis, Arkansas, in 1962. Posey obtained work as a session singer after being recommended by an aunt to an acquaintance who worked in television.

In addition to working as a receptionist at a studio in Memphis, she took part in recording sessions across the Deep South, including sessions produced by Lincoln "Chips" Moman for Elvis Presley and on Percy Sledge’s "When a Man Loves a Woman" (a number one hit in the US in 1966). Other singers whom she backed included Joe Tex, Bobby Goldsboro and Tommy Roe.

== Solo career ==
Posey's first single, under the name Sandy Carmel, was "Kiss Me Goodnight" (1965), written by William Cates, which was coupled with "First Boy". The Bell Records release received minimal publicity and made little impact. Assisted by Gary Walker, a music publisher who became her manager, Posey then made a demonstration recording of "Born a Woman", written by Martha Sharp. According to Posey, Chips Moman "went wild" when he heard this and helped her to obtain a contract with MGM in Nashville.

=== "Born a Woman" ===
Posey had her first hit with "Born a Woman", which Moman produced in Nashville on March 15, 1966. This reached number 12 on the Hot 100 in August 1966. It sold over one million copies and was awarded a gold disc. "Born a Woman" is a song featuring prominent piano, understated strings and horns, and distinctive multitracked vocals. Posey received two Grammy Award nominations for "Born a Woman" in the categories of vocal performance (female) and contemporary (R&R) solo vocal. "Born a Woman" was covered in Australia in 1966 by Judy Stone, and her version and Sandy Posey's version both reached the top 5 in that country. The song was later covered by Nick Lowe (Bowi EP) and Hubble Bubble. The song was later used by Rush Limbaugh for his “Feminist Update”.

=== "Single Girl" ===
Posey's next single release was "Single Girl", also written by Martha Sharp. Recorded in Nashville on August 19, 1966, this also reached number 12 in America in January 1967 and number 15 in Great Britain, where it benefited from airplay on pirate radio (peaking, for example, at number 7 in Radio London's non-sales-based Fab 40 on New Year's Day, 1967). It followed "Born a Woman" by selling in excess of one million copies. "Single Girl" was re-released in Britain in 1975 and reached the top 50 for a second time.

=== "What a Woman in Love Won't Do" ===
In November 1966, "What a Woman in Love Won't Do" hit No. 31 on the Hot 100, while in the UK singles chart it peaked at No. 48.

=== Other work ===
Posey's final pop top 20 hit was "I Take It Back", another US number 12 in July 1967, although she made other recordings for MGM Records until 1968. These were mostly produced by Moman, but a few, including a version of The Shirelles' hit "Will You Still Love Me Tomorrow" (1968), were produced by Joe South.

=== Country recordings ===
Posey turned to the country music field in 1971, signing with Columbia Records with Billy Sherrill as producer. Sherrill had just successfully turned another 1960s pop star, Jody Miller, into a leading country female vocalist, and it appeared Posey might be another one when the first single, "Bring Him Safely Home to Me" hit the top 20. However, it was not to be, with only two other singles barely scraping into the top 40. Posey signed with Monument Records in 1976 with just one single charting and later in the year moved to Warner Bros. Records. Her first single for the label inauspiciously peaked at No. 93, but in 1978 and 1979 she charted three top 30 country hits before this brief comeback faded away with the new decade.

Posey occasionally recorded as a solo artist in the early 1980s but reverted to occasional background session work and later briefly performed as a background vocalist for Skeeter Davis on an international tour. She made a number of country recordings with a religious theme after embracing Christianity in 1974.

In 1983, Posey had another charted single on the country charts, titled "Can't Get Used to Sleeping Without You". In 2004, Posey recorded an album for King Records in Nashville, Tennessee. She subsequently signed with Crossworlds Entertainment of Lebanon, Tennessee. During 2007, Posey released several songs through Crossworlds Entertainment.

== Personal life and death ==
On February 4, 1969, Posey married James "Billy" Buchanan Robinson Jr. The couple had one daughter, but they later divorced. Posey then married Elvis impersonator and Christian evangelist "Elvis" Wade Cummins. Posey died from complications of dementia at her home in Lebanon, Tennessee, on July 20, 2024, at the age of 80.

== Discography ==
=== Albums ===
Year	Album	Chart Positions		Label
Year	Album	US	US Country	Label
1966	Born a Woman	129	—	MGM
1967	Single Girl	—	—	MGM
1967	Sandy Posey Featuring "I Take It Back"	182	—	MGM
1967	The Best of Sandy Posey	—	—	MGM
1968	Looking at You	—	—	MGM
1968	The Very Best of Sandy Posey	—	—	MGM
1972	Why Don't We Go Somewhere and Love	—	28	Columbia
1982	Because of You	—	—	Audiograph
1982	Tennessee Rose	—	—	51 West
1994	The Classic Gold of Sandy Posey	—	—	WorldStar
— denotes releases that did not chart.

=== Singles ===
Year	Single (A-side, B-side) Both sides from same album except where indicated	Chart Positions							Album
Year	Single (A-side, B-side) Both sides from same album except where indicated	US	US Country	CAN	CAN Country	UK	AUS	SA	Album
1966	"Born a Woman" b/w "Caution to the Wind"	12	—	7	—	24	12	—	Born a Woman
1966	"Single Girl"^{[A]} b/w "Blue Is My Best Color" (from Born a Woman)	12	—	5	—	15	6	1	Single Girl
1967	"What a Woman in Love Won't Do" b/w "Shattered" (from Single Girl)	31	—	29	—	48	25	—	The Very Best of Sandy Posey
1967	"I Take It Back" b/w "The Boy I Love"	12	—	6	—	—	9	4	Sandy Posey
1967	"Don't Touch Me" b/w "I'm Your Puppet"	—	—	—	—	—	—	—	Single Girl
1967	"Are You Never Coming Home" b/w "I Can Show You How to Live" (from Sandy Posey)	59	—	70	—	—	—	—	The Best of Sandy Posey
1968	"Something I'll Remember" b/w "Silly Girl, Silly Boy"	102	—	—	—	—	—	—	Looking at You
1968	"Ways of the World" b/w "The Wonderful World of Summer" (Non-album track)	—	—	—	—	—	—	—	Sandy Posey (Golden Archive Series)
1968	"Your Conception of Love" b/w "All Hung Up in Your Green Eyes" (Non-album track)	—	—	—	—	—	—	—	Sandy Posey (Golden Archive Series)
1971	"You Say Beautiful Things to Me" b/w "Losing Out on You"	—	—	—	—	—	—	—	Why Don't We Go Somewhere and Love
1971	"Bring Him Safely Home to Me" b/w "A Man in Need of Love"	—	18	—	13	—	—	—	Why Don't We Go Somewhere and Love
1972	"Why Don't We Go Somewhere and Love" b/w "Together"	—	51	—	—	—	—	—	Why Don't We Go Somewhere and Love
1972	"Happy, Happy Birthday Baby" b/w "Thank the Lord for New York City"	—	36	—	—	—	—	—	Non-album tracks
1973	"Don't" b/w "Thank the Lord for New York City"	—	39	—	60	—	—	—	Non-album tracks
1976	"Trying to Live Without You Kind of Days" b/w "Why Do We Carry On (The Way We Do)"	—	99	—	—	—	—	—	Non-album tracks
1976	"It's Midnight (Do You Know Where Your Baby Is?)" b/w "Long Distance Kissing"	—	93	—	—	—	—	—	Non-album tracks
1978	"Born to Be with You" b/w "It's Not Too Late"	—	21	—	—	—	—	—	Non-album tracks
1978	"Love, Love, Love/Chapel of Love" b/w "I Believe in Love"	—	26	—	19	—	—	—	Non-album tracks
1979	"Love Is Sometimes Easy" b/w "I Believe in Love"	—	26	—	30	—	—	—	Non-album tracks
1979	"Try Home" b/w "Love Is Sometimes Easy"	—	82	—	—	—	—	—	Non-album tracks
1982	"She's Got You"^{[B]}	—	—	—	—	—	—	—	Because of You
1983	"Can't Get Used to Sleeping Without You" b/w "You Can't Ride on My Coat Tail"	—	88	—	—	—	—	—	Because of You
— denotes releases that did not chart.

Notes

- A "Single Girl" was re-released in the UK in 1975 and peaked at No. 35.
- B "She's Got You" peaked at No. 22 on the Canadian Adult Contemporary Tracks chart.
