= Crash (The Primitives song) =

1988 single by the Primitives

Single by the Primitives

from the album Lovely
- B-side: "I'll Stick with You"
- Released: 15 February 1988
- Genre: Indie pop; power pop
- Length: 2:31 (album version); 3:15 (The 95 Mix)
- Label: RCA; Lazy
- Songwriters: Paul Court; Steve Dullaghan; Tracy Cattell
- Producers: Mark Wallis; Paul Sampson

The Primitives singles chronology
"Thru the Flowers" (1987)	"Crash" (1988)	"Out of Reach" (1988)

Music video
- "Crash" on YouTube

"Crash" is a song by British indie pop band the Primitives, written by band members Paul Court, Steve Dullaghan, and Tracy Cattell. The song was first recorded for the band's 1988 debut album, Lovely. It was released as a single in February 1988, peaking at number five on the UK Singles Chart, number three on the US Modern Rock Tracks chart, and number two on the Swedish Singles Chart. Its UK success saw the group perform the song on the BBC's Top of the Pops.

In 1994, the song was featured on the Dumb & Dumber film soundtrack as "Crash (The '95 Mix)". This remix included additional guitars, percussion, organ, and backing vocals—none of which were performed by any of the Primitives.

== Track listings ==
UK 7-inch single

A. "Crash"
B. "I'll Stick with You"

UK 10-inch single

A1. "Crash" – 2:32
B1. "I'll Stick with You" – 1:58
B2. "Crash" (live in studio) – 2:06

UK 12-inch single

A1. "Crash" – 2:32
A2. "I'll Stick with You" – 2:34
B1. "Crash" (demo recorded October 1985) – 2:19
B2. "Things Get in Your Way" – 2:21

== Charts ==
=== Weekly charts ===
Chart (1988)	Peak position
Denmark (Hitlisten)	16
Europe (Eurochart Hot 100)	18
Ireland (IRMA)	3
New Zealand (Recorded Music NZ)	11
South Africa (Springbok Radio)	15
Sweden (Sverigetopplistan)	2
UK Singles (OCC)	5
US Modern Rock Tracks (Billboard)	3
West Germany (GfK)	42

=== Year-end charts ===
Chart (1988)	Position
UK Singles (OCC)	94

== Certifications ==
Region	Certification	Certified units/sales
United Kingdom (BPI)	Silver	200,000^{‡}
^{‡} Sales+streaming figures based on certification alone.

== Cover versions ==
=== Chloë version ===
"Crash"

Single by Chloë

from the album Beyond Coming
- Released: 5 September 2005
- Length: 3:17
- Label: Sony BMG
- Songwriters: Paul Court, Steve Dullaghan, Tracy Spencer
- Producer: Paul Whilshire

Chloë singles chronology
"Stars" (2004)	"Crash" (2005)

"Crash" was covered by Australian singer-songwriter Chloë for her album Beyond Coming, and released as her second single on 5 September 2005. It peaked at No. 10 on the Australian Singles Chart.

The music video was directed by Mark Barold, and filmed at a Sushi Train restaurant. It depicts Chloë as a customer. Instead of sushi going around the conveyor belt there are objects like a drummer, some dancers, a fish and a pair of sumo wrestlers.

==== Track listing ====
1. "Crash" – 3:16
2. "Crash" (Crackle N' Pop remix) – 7:03
3. "Stars" (Sterling remix) – 3:39

==== Charts ====
Chart (2005)	Peak position
Australia (ARIA)	10

=== Matt Willis version ===
"Crash"

Single by Matt Willis

from the album Mr. Bean's Holiday OST
- Released: 16 April 2007
- Length: 3:00
- Label: Mercury
- Songwriters: Paul Court; Steve Dullaghan; Tracy Spencer

Matt Willis singles chronology
"Don't Let It Go to Waste" (2006)	"Crash" (2007)

"Crash" was also covered by British singer-songwriter Matt Willis and released as a single on 16 April 2007. Willis rerecorded the song specially for the 2007 film Mr. Bean's Holiday, for which Rowan Atkinson appeared as his character in the music video along with Willis.

==== Track listing ====
UK CD single
No.	Title	Writer(s)	Length
1.	"Crash"	Paul Court; Steve Dullaghan; Tracy Spencer	3:00
2.	"The Power of Love"	Huey Lewis; Chris Hayes; Johnny Colla	4:28
3.	"Crash" (music video)

==== Charts ====
Chart (2007)	Peak position
Scotland Singles (OCC)	14
UK Singles (OCC)	31

=== Other artists ===
- PLASTICZOOMS featuring Alina Rin
- Belle & Sebastian covered the song for their 2012 album Late Night Tales: Belle & Sebastian Vol. II
