= The Primitives =

British indie pop band

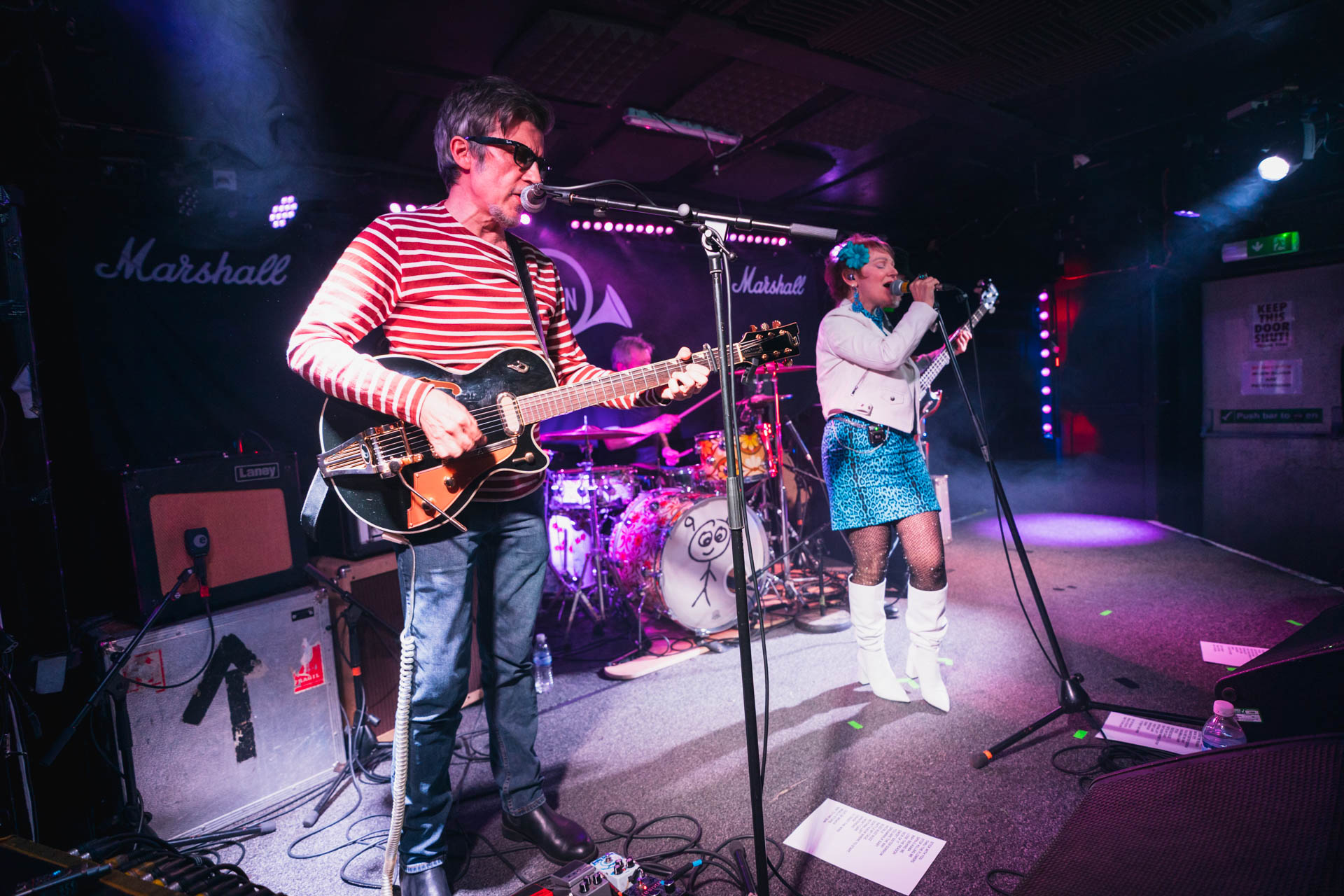
- The Primitives performing in 2025

Background information
- Origin: Coventry, West Midlands, England
- Genres: Indie pop; power pop; new wave; post-punk
- Years active: 1984–1992; 2009–present
- Labels: Elefant; Fortuna Pop!; Happy Happy Birthday to Me; Lazy; RCA
- Members: Paul Court; Tracy Tracy; Tig Williams; Paul Sampson
- Past members: Steve Dullaghan; Peter Tweedie; Keiron McDermott; Clive Layton; Andy Hobson; Neil Champion; Raph Moore; Tony Croke

The Primitives are an English indie pop band formed in Coventry, best known for their 1988 international hit single "Crash". Formed in 1984, disbanded in 1992 and reformed in 2009, the band's two constant members throughout their recording career have been vocalist Tracy Tracy and guitarist Paul "PJ" Court. Drummer Tig Williams has been a constant member since 1987. Often described as an indie pop or indie rock band, the Primitives' musical style can also be seen as straddling power pop, new wave and post-punk. The sound has drawn comparisons to American rock band Blondie.

== Early career and mainstream success (1986–1994) ==
The Primitives were formed in the summer of 1984 by PJ Court (born Paul Jonathan Court) (vocals, guitar), Steve Dullaghan (born Stephen Anthony Dullaghan, ex–Nocturnal Babies) (bass guitar), Peter Tweedie (drums) and Keiron McDermott, ex-Nocturnal Babies (vocals). Vocalist McDermott was later replaced by Tracy Tracy (born Tracy Louise Cattell). Tig Williams replaced Pete Tweedie on drums in October 1987.

McDermott left the band claiming that he could not work with new manager Wayne Morris, and so reformed the Nocturnal Babies. Needing a singer for an upcoming gig, Court wrote on a piece of scrap paper "male singer wanted" and posted it at the Coventry library. Tracy responded that afternoon.

The band were part of the indie music scene of the mid-1980s, alongside bands like the Soup Dragons and the Wedding Present. Their major rivals within the 'blonde pop' scene were Transvision Vamp and the Darling Buds. They received valuable publicity when the Smiths' lead vocalist Morrissey was photographed wearing a Primitives T-shirt.

The band's early singles were released on their own Lazy Records imprint. In late 1987, they signed the label over to RCA, which released the band's material from then until their split.

Lovely (1988), the band's debut studio album, reached No. 6 on the UK Albums Chart, and produced two top 40 hit singles: "Crash" (UK No. 5, US Modern Rock No. 3) and "Out of Reach" (UK No. 25). "Crash", and the band were described in Melody Maker as "the perfect band who have made the perfect single".

"Way Behind Me" was released as a single soon after, and was included on later versions of the debut album, as well as on the follow-up studio album Pure. 1988 was the band's peak year; in addition to the hit album and singles, the band undertook a sell-out tour of the UK, ending in two nights in May at London's Town & Country Club.

The studio album Pure (1989) was preceded by three singles: "Way Behind Me" (UK No. 36, US Modern Rock No. 8), "Sick of It" (UK No. 24, US Modern Rock No. 9) and "Secrets", (UK No. 49, US Modern Rock No. 12).

In 1990, the band co-headlined a tour of the US with the Sugarcubes as well as a short tour of Japan. They split in 1992 following the commercial failure of their third studio album Galore (1991). Their song "Crash" was featured on the soundtrack album for the Peter Farrelly film Dumb and Dumber in 1994.

== Reformation (2009–present) ==
Steve Dullaghan died in Coventry on 4 February 2009, following which, after nearly 18 years of dormancy, the Primitives re-formed, with new bassist Raphael Moore. Their first live shows were in Coventry and at the Buffalo Bar in London in October 2009. In early 2010, the Primitives toured the UK and performed a single US concert at The Bell House in New York City. The Primitives supported the Wedding Present at Koko in Camden, London on 13 December 2010 as part of that band's Bizarro album 21st anniversary tour.

The Primitives returned to the studio with original producer Paul Sampson, recording the EP Never Kill a Secret, featuring two original songs — the title track and "Rattle My Cage" — and two cover versions of lesser-known female-fronted songs — "Need All the Help I Can Get" (written by Lee Hazlewood and originally recorded by Suzi Jane Hokom in 1966) and "Breakaway" (originally recorded by Toni Basil in 1966). The EP was released on 7 March 2011. The album Echoes and Rhymes followed in 2012, featuring 14 further recordings of lesser-known female-fronted songs. The Japanese edition of Echoes and Rhymes features three additional bonus tracks, two of which are remix versions of "Need All the Help I Can Get" and "Breakaway". The third bonus track "Can't Stop the Want", also featured on the digital EP Turn Off the Moon.

Their original track "You Trashed My Christmas" is featured on the Elefant Records compilation album A Christmas Gift for You from Elefant Records. An accompanying video for the track was released. In March 2013, the compilation album Everything's Shining Bright – The Lazy Recordings 1985 – 1987 was issued. The compilation featured all of the Lazy releases; unreleased, different versions of songs that were on Lovely; some 1985 demos; and the 1987 ICA show, with Morrissey introducing the band on stage.

The single "Lose the Reason" was released on 18 February 2013 through Elefant Records. Spin-O-Rama, the group's fifth studio album, was released on Elefant on 13 October 2014, and it was preceded by the release of the title track as a 7" and download single.

In April 2017, the four-song collection New Thrills was released. The first 1,000 copies were personally autographed by band members. Included with the album was a code and instructions for digital download.

== Members ==
Current members

- Paul Court – guitars, vocals (1985–1991, 2009–present)
- Tracy Tracy (aka Tracy Cattell) – vocals (1986–1991, 2009–present)
- Tig Williams – drums (1987–1991, 2009–present)
- Paul Sampson – bass (1989–1991, 2020–present)

Former members

- Steve Dullaghan – bass, guitars (1985–1989; died 2009)
- Peter Tweedie – drums (1985–1987)
- Keiron McDermott – vocals (1985–1986)
- Clive Layton – keyboards (1988–1991)
- Andy Hobson – bass (1989)
- Neil Champion – bass (1991)
- Raph Moore – bass (2009-2019)

== Discography ==
- Lovely (1988)
- Pure (1989)
- Galore (1991)
- Echoes and Rhymes (2012)
- Spin-O-Rama (2014)
