= Whitney Phillips =

American songwriter

- Birth name: Whitney Lauren Phillips
- Genres: Pop
- Occupation: Songwriter
- Years active: 2012–present

Whitney Phillips is an American singer and songwriter, sometimes credited as Whitney Lauren Phillips. She has co-written songs for various artists, including Christina Aguilera, Celine Dion, Kylie Minogue, Justin Bieber and Ariana Grande.

== Early life ==
A native of Seattle, Phillips attended Loyola Marymount University in Los Angeles.

== Career ==
=== Songwriter ===
Phillips's first songwriting credit was as the lyricist for the Stafford Brothers' 2012 song "Hello". In 2014, she co-wrote the Stafford Brothers song "This Girl", and "Delirious (Boneless)" from the Steve Aoki album Neon Future I. In 2015, Phillips co-wrote the songs "Black and White" and "Your Body" for the Kylie Minogue and Fernando Garibay EP Kylie and Garibay, "Broke" on the Joe Budden album All Love Lost, and "These Are the Days" on the Omi album Me 4 U.

In 2016, Phillips co-wrote "Happiness" on the Needtobreathe album Hard Love, the Cher Lloyd single "Activated", the Steve Aoki single "Can't Go Home", and "Shots Fired" on the Sawyer Fredericks album A Good Storm. In 2017, she co-wrote the Fifth Harmony single "Deliver", the Mr. Probz single "Til You Are Loved", and DJ Cassidy's track "Honor". Phillips also co-wrote and performed on the 2017 singles "Out of Love" by Indiia, and "Mutual" by Tom & Collins.

In 2018, Phillips co-wrote two tracks, "Sick of Sittin'" and "Like I Do", on the Christina Aguilera album Liberation. She also co-wrote two tracks, "Love Me & Let Me Go" and "Voices in My Head", on the Ashley Tisdale album Symptoms. Phillips also composed "Bad Boy" on the Red Velvet album Perfect Velvet, "Come Clean" on the Conrad Sewell album Ghosts & Heartaches, and co-wrote the singles "Origami" by Era Istrefi, and "Done" by Nikki Vianna. In 2019, Phillips co-wrote "The Hard Way" on the Celine Dion deluxe album Courage, and the Zara Larsson single "Don't Worry Bout Me" She also co-wrote the tracks "Tomboy" and "Strong Ones" on the Destiny Rogers EP Tomboy, and "Loner" on the Terror Jr album Unfortunately, Terror Jr.

In 2020, Philips received her first No. 1 on the Billboard Hot 100 with "Stuck with U", performed by Justin Bieber and Ariana Grande. She also co-wrote the Aksel Kankaanranta song "Looking Back", which was selected to represent Finland in the Eurovision Song Contest 2020, though the contest was ultimately cancelled due to the COVID-19 pandemic. Phillips co-wrote "Kickin' Pushin'" on the Destiny Rogers album Great Escape. In 2021, she co-wrote "Love You Different" on the Justin Bieber album Justice, and co-wrote "I Am" on the Bebe Rexha album Bebe in 2023. In 2024, Phillips co-wrote "Damn Good Country Song" on the Corey Kent album Black Bandana, and the Teddy Swims single "Funeral".

In 2025, Phillips appeared on the Netflix music docu-reality series Hitmakers.

=== Vocalist ===
As a performer, Phillips was a featured vocalist on "Strike" from the Morgan Page's 2015 album DC to Light, Bobby Green's 2016 single "Lights", the 2016 Far East Movement track "Dubs Up", "Blackout" from Mike Stud's 2016 album These Days, and the 2017 Glenn Morrison single "Cold Day". She also co-wrote and performed on the 2017 tracks "Out of Love" by Indiia, and "Mutual" by Tom & Collins.

=== Songwriting credits ===
| Title | Year | Artist(s) | Album | Written with | Ref. |
|---|---|---|---|---|---|
| "Hello" | 2012 | Stafford Brothers | Single | Christina Milian, Dwayne Carter, Alex James, Harry Mikael Sommerdahl | |
| "This Girl" | 2014 | Stafford Brothers | Single | T.I., Alex James, Onefeme Ogbene, Eva Simons, Harry Sommerdahl, Chris Stafford, Matthew Stafford | |
| "Delirious (Boneless)" | 2014 | Steve Aoki | Neon Future I | Erin Beck, Brian Todd Collins, Lake, Jenson Vaughan, Aid Vllasaliu | |
| "Black and White" | 2015 | Kylie Minogue; Fernando Garibay | Kylie and Garibay | Kylie Minogue, Orville Burrell, Fernando Garibay | |
| "Your Body" | 2015 | Kylie Minogue; Fernando Garibay | Kylie and Garibay | Minogue, Garibay, Giorgio Moroder, Gary Go, Gino Campagna, Jamie Hartman, Max McElligott | |
| "Broke" | 2015 | Joe Budden | All Love Lost | Joe Budden | |
| "These Are the Days" | 2015 | Omi | Me 4 U | Louis Bell, Carl Austin Rosen, Omar Samuel Pasley | |
| "Happiness" | 2016 | Needtobreathe | Hard Love | Bear Rinehart, Bo Rinehart, Ido Zmishlany | |
| "Activated" | 2016 | Cher Lloyd | Single | Cher Lloyd, Louis Bell, Soaky Siren | |
| "Can't Go Home" | 2016 | Steve Aoki | Single | Alex James, Clarence Coffee Jr., Felix Jaehn, Harry Sommerdahl, Steve Aoki | |
| "Shots Fired" | 2016 | Sawyer Fredericks | A Good Storm | Sawyer Fredericks, Jayson Dezuzio | |
| "Deliver" | 2017 | Fifth Harmony | Single | Jeremy Reeves, Johnathan Yip, Ray McCullough, Ray Romulus, Taylor Parks | |
| "Out of Love" | 2017 | Indiia | Single | Johannes Henriksson, Ousman Sowe, Ozzy Jaquesson Sowe, Richard Andersson | |
| "Til You Are Loved" | 2017 | Mr. Probz | Single | Brandon Smith, D.P. Stehr, Dennis Stehr, Isaac John De Boni, Khaled Rohaim, Lewis Hughes, Michael John Mule, Nicholas Audino | |
| "Honor" | 2017 | DJ Cassidy | Single | Cassidy Podell, Grace Sewell, Greg Cohen, Miles Parks McCollum | |
| "Mutual" | 2017 | Tom & Collins | Single | Jorge Brent Corral, Juan Pablo Escudero, Romain Strugala | |
| "Sick of Sittin'" | 2018 | Christina Aguilera | Liberation | Christina Aguilera, Brandon P. Anderson, Melvin Henderson, Janne Schaffer | |
| "Like I Do" | 2018 | Christina Aguilera | Liberation | Christina Aguilera, Brandon P. Anderson, Sang Hyeon Lee, Jonathan Park, Tayla Parx, D'Anthony Carlos | |
| "Love Me & Let Me Go" | 2018 | Ashley Tisdale | Symptoms | Ashley Tisdale, John Feldmann, Scot Stewart, Dylan Mclean | |
| "Voices in My Head" | 2018 | Ashley Tisdale | Symptoms | Ashley Tisdale, John Feldmann, Scot Stewart, Dylan Mclean | |
| "Bad Boy" | 2018 | Red Velvet | Perfect Velvet | The Stereotypes, Maxx Song (Command Freaks), Yoo Young-jin | |
| "Come Clean" | 2018 | Conrad Sewell | Ghosts & Heartaches | Conrad Sewell, Busbee | |
| "Origami" | 2018 | Era Istrefi | Single | Era Istrefi, Jarrad Rogers, Jerker Hansson | |
| "Done" | 2018 | Nikki Vianna | Single | Bryan Fryzel, Nat Dunn, Nicole Spirito | |
| "The Hard Way" | 2019 | Celine Dion | Courage | Jessica Karpov, Greg Wells | |
| "Don't Worry Bout Me" | 2019 | Zara Larsson | Single | Zara Larsson, Tove Lo, Rami Yacoub, Linnea Södahl, Jakob Jerlström, Ludvig Söderberg | |
| "Tomboy" | 2019 | Destiny Rogers | Tomboy (EP) | Jonathan Yip, Jeremy Reeves, Ray Romulus, Ray Charles McCullough II, Destiny Rogers | |
| "Strong Ones" | 2019 | Destiny Rogers | Tomboy (EP) | Jonathan Yip, Jeremy Reeves, Ray Romulus, Ray Charles McCullough II, Destiny Rogers | |
| "Loner" | 2019 | Terror Jr | Unfortunately, Terror Jr | Lisa Vitale, David Singer-Vine, Jonathan Yip, Ray Romulus, Jeremy Reeves, Ray Charles McCullough II | |
| "Stuck with U" | 2020 | Justin Bieber; Ariana Grande | Single | Ariana Grande, Justin Bieber, Freddy Wexler, Gian Stone, Scott Braun, Skyler Stonestreet | |
| "Looking Back" | 2020 | Aksel Kankaanranta | Eurovision Song Contest 2020 entry | Joonas Angeria, Connor McDonough, Riley McDonough, Toby McDonough | |
| "Kickin' Pushin'" | 2020 | Destiny Rogers | Great Escape | Jonathan Yip, Jeremy Reeves, Ray Romulus, Carmen Reece, Ray Charles McCullough II, Bianca "Blush" Atterberry, Destiny Rogers | |
| "Love You Different" | 2021 | Justin Bieber | Justice | Justin Bieber, Tyshane Thompson, Marcus Lomax, Alexander Izquierdo, Oliver Peterhof, Jordan Douglas | |
| "I Am" | 2023 | Bebe Rexha | Bebe | Bebe Rexha, Joe Janiak, Maya K, Tim Pagnotta, Brian Phillips | |
| "Damn Good Country Song" | 2024 | Corey Kent | Black Bandana | Ben Burgess, Michael Lotten | |
| "Funeral" | 2024 | Teddy Swims | Single | Jaten Dimsdale, Jon Green, Julian Bunetta, Mikky Ekko | |

=== Performer credits ===
| Title | Year | Artist | Album | Ref. |
|---|---|---|---|---|
| "Strike" | 2015 | Morgan Page | DC to Light | |
| "Lights" | 2016 | Bobby Green | Single | |
| "Dubs Up" | 2016 | Far East Movement | Single | |
| "Blackout" | 2016 | Mike Stud | These Days | |
| "Cold Day" | 2017 | Glenn Morrison | Single | |
| "Out of Love" | 2017 | Indiia | Single | |
| "Mutual" | 2017 | Tom & Collins | Single | |

== Accolades ==
"Hello" was nominated for Song of the Year at the 2013 ARIA Music Awards. "Like I Do" received a Grammy Award nomination for Best Rap/Sung Performance at the 61st Annual Grammy Awards, held in 2019.
