= Whippin =

Single by Kiiara featuring Felix Snow
- Released: April 12, 2017
- Recorded: 2017
- Genre: Pop
- Length: 2:40
- Label: Atlantic
- Songwriters: Kiara Saulters; David Singer-Vine; Kurtis McKenzie
- Producers: Felix Snow; INNR CHLD

Kiiara singles chronology
"Heavy" (2017)	"Whippin" (2017)	"Complicated" (2017)

Felix Snow singles chronology
"Redrum" (2017)	"Whippin" (2017)	"Can't Nobody" (2017)

Music video
- "Whippin" on YouTube

"Whippin" is a song by American singer Kiiara, featuring American electronic music producer Felix Snow and was included on her debut studio album Lil Kiiwi. It was released on April 12, 2017 through Atlantic Records.

== Composition ==
"Whippin" is in the key of G minor, and moves at a tempo of 83 beats per minute in a 4/4 time signature. It features electronic voice glitches over a hip hop-inspired beat. It was compared to her hit single "Gold."

== Critical reception ==
Mike Wass of Idolator said "'Whippin' is all about capturing a vibe via a repetitive chorus and demented electronic production. There is a little more bite this time, however, courtesy of Kiiara's fiery verses." Sam Murphy of The Interns wrote that "there are similarities to 'Gold' but ultimately it’s a new beast with even sweeter hooks." The Musical Hype was more critical of the song, writing that it called for "no need for deep analysis." He additionally called the second verse "forced," and wrote that "anyone could’ve recorded 'Whippin.'"

== Music video ==
The music video for "Whippin" was released on May 8, 2017 and it was directed by Colin Tilley. It features Kiiara on various modes of transportation.

== Track listing ==
Digital download
No.	Title	Length
1.	"Whippin" (featuring Felix Snow)	2:40

== Charts ==
Chart (2017)	Peak position
Belgium (Ultratip Bubbling Under Flanders)	46
Canada Hot 100 (Billboard)	94
Czech Republic Singles Digital (ČNS IFPI)	47
Netherlands (Single Tip)	13
New Zealand Heatseekers (RMNZ)	6
Sweden Heatseeker (Sverigetopplistan)	9

== Certifications ==
Region	Certification	Certified units/sales
Canada (Music Canada)	Gold	40,000^{‡}
^{‡} Sales+streaming figures based on certification alone.

== Release history ==
Region	Date	Format	Label	Ref.
United States	April 12, 2017	Digital download	Atlantic	
