= Unfortunately =

Unfortunately may refer to:

- Unfortunately (horse), a Thoroughbred racehorse
- Unfortunately, Terror Jr, a 2019 album by Terror Jr
- Unfortunately, an album by Canadian rock band Shalabi Effect
