= Low Kii Savage =

EP by Kiiara
- Released: March 22, 2016
- Genre: Electropop
- Length: 21:24
- Label: Effess; Atlantic; Warner
- Producer: Casper & B.; Brenton Duvall; Felix Snow

Kiiara chronology
Low Kii Savage (2016)	Lil Kiiwi (2020)

Singles from Low Kii Savage
- 1. "Gold" Released: October 26, 2015; 2. "Feels" Released: January 15, 2016

Low Kii Savage (stylized as low kii savage) is the debut extended play (EP) by American singer and songwriter Kiiara. It was released on March 22, 2016, through Effess, Atlantic Records, and Warner Music Group. The EP was produced by Casper and B., Brenton Duvall, Felix Snow, and executively produced by David Singer-Vine.

== Composition ==
Musically, Low Kii Savage is a set of songs where Kiiara breathily sings over gloomy electronic pop and trap instrumentals about, according to writer Chester Chin, "casual flirtations and epic parties." Andy Kellman of AllMusic compared it to the works of Jhené Aiko, Lorde, and Banks.

== Critical reception ==
Professional ratings
Review scores
Source	Rating
AllMusic	2/5 stars
Renowned for Sound	2.5/5 stars
Spin	8/10
Star2	8/10

Brennan Carley of Spin magazine wrote that on Low Kii Savage, Kiiara "possesses all the chill of mint gum but her hooks are bubblelicious." Chin, writing for Star2.com, opined that while some of the EP's songs were "forgettable," the record was enjoyable for its "ethereal" electronic sound and Kiiara's vocal performances that made it "effortlessly sexy." Renowned for Sound disliked most of Low Kii Savage for focusing more on club music tropes and sounds than emotional impacts on the listener, and Kellman dismissed the EP as unmemorable "of-the-moment mood music."

== Commercial performance ==
On the Billboard week dated April 16, 2016, Low Kii Savage, debuted at number 192 on the magazine's official United States album chart and 13 on its Heatseekers Albums chart; it sold 4,000 units and 1,000 copies in its first week on the chart. On the week of June 4, due to the chart ranking streaming equivalent albums, the amount of streams on "Gold" led the EP to rise from number 165 to 153; 73% of the position rise was attributed to "Gold"'s streaming figures (4.4 million on-demand streams). By the week of July 23, Low Kii Savage went from position 114 to 78, selling 8,000 equivalent album units that week. The album finally peaked at number 41.

== Singles ==
"Gold" was released as the lead single from the EP digitally on October 26, 2015, and later to Top 40 radio on May 10, 2016. The single became her first entry on the US Billboard Hot 100, where it peaked at number 13 in October 2016.

"Feels" was released on January 15, 2016, as the second single from the EP. "Hang Up tha Phone" premiered on Zane Lowe's Beats 1 show on March 21, 2016.

== Track listing ==
No.	Title	Writer(s)	Producer(s)	Length
1.	"Gold"	David Singer-Vine; Felix Snow; Kiara Saulters	Snow	3:45
2.	"Feels"	Brenton Duvall; Snow; Blaise Riley; Singer-Vine; Saulters	Duvall; Snow	3:02
3.	"Tennessee"	Singer-Vine; Snow; Saulters; Niles Hollowell-Dhar	Snow	4:20
4.	"Intention"	Bryan Jarett; Dan Ullmann; Saulters	Casper & B.	3:49
5.	"Say Anymore"	Singer-Vine; Snow; Nyle LeBlanc; Saulters	Snow	2:48
6.	"Hang Up tha Phone"	Singer-Vine; Snow; Saulters	Snow	3:40
Total length:				21:24

== Charts ==
=== Weekly charts ===
Chart (2016)	Peak position
Australian Albums (ARIA)	46
Canadian Albums (Billboard)	35
US Billboard 200	41
US Heatseekers Albums (Billboard)	13

=== Year-end charts ===
Chart (2016)	Peak position
US Billboard 200	136

== Certifications ==
Region	Certification	Certified units/sales
New Zealand (RMNZ)	Gold	7,500^{‡}
^{‡} Sales+streaming figures based on certification alone.

== Release history ==
Region	Date	Format	Label	Ref.
Worldwide	March 22, 2016	Digital download	Effess; Atlantic; Warner	
United States	May 27, 2016	Vinyl	Effess; Atlantic; Warner	
