= Me 4 U =

Studio album by Omi
- Released: 16 October 2015
- Recorded: 2011–2015
- Studio: Miami, Florida; United Kingdom
- Genre: Tropical house; reggae
- Length: 45:58
- Label: Ultra; Columbia
- Producer: Omar Samuel Pasley; Salaam Remi; Clifton Dillon; Felix Jaehn; Matt James; Frank Buelles

Omi chronology
Me 4 U (2015)	Formula (2023)

Singles from Me 4 U
- 1. "Cheerleader" Released: 19 May 2014; 2. "Hula Hoop" Released: 28 August 2015; 3. "Drop in the Ocean" Released: 17 March 2016

Me 4 U is the debut studio album by Jamaican singer Omi. It was released on 16 October 2015; as of 2026 it is Omi’s most recent studio album, being released through Ultra Music and Columbia Records. Three singles were released from the album: "Cheerleader" (remixed by Felix Jaehn), "Hula Hoop" and "Drop in the Ocean" (featuring Swedish DJ AronChupa).

The first single "Cheerleader" became a massive global success in 2015, reached number one in 20 countries, including the United States, the United Kingdom, Australia, France, and Germany.

== Background and release ==
The first single "Cheerleader" was eight years in the making. Omi stated in an interview with Billboard, "I woke up humming the melody one morning when I was 21. It was like a little Jamaican nursery rhyme, like 'one, two, buckle my shoe,' that kind of thing – 'ring game' is what we'd call it. The rest of the song just fell into place like a jigsaw puzzle." He also stated "People are expecting 15 [versions of] 'Cheerleader,' but it's going to be pretty diverse, with a few features and songs written from different perspectives."

== Critical reception ==
Professional ratings
Review scores
Source	Rating
AllMusic	3.5/5 stars
Rolling Stone	2/5 stars
Slant Magazine	3.5/5 stars

The album received mixed reviews from critics. David Jeffries of AllMusic stated, "Omi delivers this all in a wonderful voice, falling somewhere between roots star Tarrus Riley and Kevin Lyttle when it comes to Island authenticity, the singer turns to the same great guest Nicki Minaj chooses, dancehall singer Busy Signal, who kicks 'Color of My Lips' up a notch or two. 'Fireworks' is a sexy soca number that R. Kelly could cover, while the title cut is a warm and powerful duet with Sarah West, although she doesn't get a feature credit on the album like Busy, Erik Hassle, and AronChupa do, even though she certainly deserves one. For a rushed-to-market, crossover album capitalizing on a global hit, the pleasing Me 4 U is much more well-built, well-paced, and well-rounded than expected."

Annie Licata of Rolling Stone stated the best tracks on Me 4 U "are built for good times and warm weather, complete with steel drum beats and odes to the singer's island home ('The streets, they salute me/I'm home again,' he sings on the upbeat, heartfelt 'Promised Land'). 'Color of My Lips', which features a winning guest verse from Busy Signal, and 'Hula Hoop' match the catchy melodies and silky vocals heard on 'Cheerleader.' A few other highlights further the vibe of naive crushes and summertime fun. But Omi's attempts at darker love songs mostly fall flat. 'Standing on All Threes' is a woeful, surface-deep guitar jam. The title track leans heavily on a pallid R&B beat, and while Omi's vocals hit their notes, the song never catches fire. Most of his newfound fans would have a better time making a playlist with 'Cheerleader' 14 times in a row."

== Commercial performance ==
Me 4 U debuted at number 51 on the US Billboard 200 chart, selling 9,000 equivalent copies (3,000 in pure album sales).

== Track listing ==
No.	Title	Writer(s)	Producer(s)	Length
1.	"Cheerleader" (Felix Jaehn Remix Radio Edit)	Omar Samuel Pasley; Clifton Dillon; Mark Bradford; Ryan Dillon; Sly Dunbar	OMI; C. Dillon; Felix Jaehn	3:01
2.	"Babylon"	John Ryan; Thomas Hull	Ryan; Kid Harpoon	3:23
3.	"Drop in the Ocean" (featuring AronChupa)	Aron Ekberg; Emily Warren; Scott Harris; Oscar Scivier; Ash Pournouri	AronChupa	2:57
4.	"These Are the Days" (Luca Schreiner Remix)	Whitney Phillips; Louis Bell; Carl Austin Rosen; Pasley	Luca Schreiner	3:08
5.	"Hula Hoop"	Pasley; Karl Wolf; Jenson Vaughan; Matthew "Matt James" Humphrey; Frank Buelles	Humphrey; Buelles	3:26
6.	"Standing on All Threes"	Pasley; C. Dillon; R. Dillon; Dunbar	C. Dillon	3:17
7.	"Promised Land"	Konstantin Scherer; Vincent Stein; Nico Santos; Matthias Zürkler; Pasley; Wim Treuner	Scherer; Stein	2:58
8.	"Color of My Lips" (featuring Busy Signal)	Pasley; C. Dillon; Reanno Gordon; R. Dillon	C. Dillon; R. Dillon	3:10
9.	"Stir It"	Nasri Atweh; Salaam Remi; C. Dillon	Remi	3:40
10.	"Fireworks"	C. Dillon; Pasley	C. Dillon	3:15
11.	"Midnight Serenade" (featuring Erik Hassle)	Hassle; Daniel Ledinsky; Pasley	Ledinsky; Hassle	3:27
12.	"Hitchhiker"	Ammar Malik; Steve Mac	Mac	3:25
13.	"Me 4 U" (featuring Sarah West)	Iain James Farquharson; Björn Djupström; Sarah West; Pasley	Djupström; Remi	3:10
14.	"Sing It Out Loud" (Freddy Verano Remix)	Remi; Pasley; Nathan Duvall; Hiten Bharadia; Andreas Moe	Remi; Freddy Verano	3:41
Total length:				45:58

== Credits and personnel ==
=== Production ===
- Omi – vocals, background vocals
- Daniel Ledinsky – composer, engineer, producer
- Ammar Malik – composer, vocals, vocals (background)
- Clayton McIntyre – composer
- Andreas Moe – composer
- Patrick Moxey – executive producer
- Whitney Phillips – composer
- Ash Pournouri – composer
- Dann Pursey – engineer
- Salaam Remi – additional production, composer, executive producer, producer
- Omar Pasley – composer, producer, vocals
- Carl Austin Rosen – composer
- John Ryan – composer, producer
- Nico Santos – composer
- Konstantin Scherer – composer, producer
- Luca Schreiner – producer
- Oscar Scivier – composer
- Merrick Shaw – engineer
- V*incent Stein – composer, producer
- Xavier Stephenson – engineer, vocal engineer
- Wim Treuner – composer
- Jenson Vaughan – composer, vocals
- Miles Walker – mastering, mixing
- Dan Warner – guitar
- Steve Mac – composer, keyboards, producer, vocals
- Emily Warren – composer
- Sarah West – composer, vocals
- Karl Wolf – composer
- Matthias Zürkler – composer

== Charts ==
=== Weekly charts ===
Chart (2015–2016)	Peak position
Australian Albums (ARIA)	37
Belgian Albums (Ultratop Wallonia)	163
Canadian Albums (Billboard)	18
Danish Albums (Hitlisten)	25
French Albums (SNEP)	62
Norwegian Albums (VG-lista)	21
Swedish Albums (Sverigetopplistan)	9
Swiss Albums (Schweizer Hitparade)	89
US Billboard 200	51

=== Year-end charts ===
Chart (2016)	Position
Swedish Albums (Sverigetopplistan)	72

== Certifications ==
Region	Certification	Certified units/sales
Canada (Music Canada)	Platinum	80,000^{‡}
Denmark (IFPI Danmark)	Gold	10,000^{‡}
New Zealand (RMNZ)	Platinum	15,000^{‡}
United States (RIAA)	Gold	500,000^{‡}
^{‡} Sales+streaming figures based on certification alone.

== Release history ==
Region	Date	Label	Format
Australia	16 October 2015	Ultra; Columbia	CD; digital download
Brazil	16 October 2015	Ultra; Columbia	CD; digital download
United Kingdom	16 October 2015	Ultra; Columbia	CD; digital download
United States	16 October 2015	Ultra; Columbia	CD; digital download
