= Hula Hoop (Omi song) =

Single by Omi

from the album Me 4 U
- Released: 28 August 2015
- Recorded: 2015
- Genre: Reggae-pop; tropical house
- Length: 3:26
- Label: Ultra; Columbia
- Songwriters: Omar Pasley; Karl Wolf; Jenson Vaughan; Matt James; Frank Buelles
- Producers: Matt James; Frank Buelles

Omi singles chronology
"Cheerleader (Felix Jaehn Remix)" (2014)	"Hula Hoop" (2015)	"Drop in the Ocean" (2016)

Music video
- "Hula Hoop" on YouTube

"Hula Hoop" is a song by Jamaican singer Omi. It was released on 28 August 2015 as the second single from his debut studio album Me 4 U (2015). The song was written by Omar Pasley (OMI), Karl Wolf, Jenson Vaughan, Matt James and Frank Buelles.

== Music video ==
The music video was released on 16 September 2015. A broadcast radio station in Miami announces a competition for picking a lead girl for Omi's "Hula Hoop" video and a number of candidates flock to the sea shore to apply. A judging panel watches the dancers perform to pick Omi's partner on his video.

== Charts ==
=== Weekly charts ===
Chart (2015)	Peak position
Australia (ARIA)	8
Austria (Ö3 Austria Top 40)	7
Belgium (Ultratip Bubbling Under Flanders)	28
Belgium (Ultratip Bubbling Under Wallonia)	3
Canada Hot 100 (Billboard)	19
Czech Republic Airplay (ČNS IFPI)	12
Czech Republic Singles Digital (ČNS IFPI)	37
Denmark (Tracklisten)	8
France (SNEP)	67
Germany (GfK)	12
Germany (Airplay Chart)	3
Hungary (Rádiós Top 40)	5
Hungary (Single Top 40)	36
Hungary (Stream Top 40)	29
Ireland (IRMA)	43
Italy (FIMI)	75
Netherlands (Dutch Top 40)	24
Netherlands (Single Top 100)	20
New Zealand (Recorded Music NZ)	23
Norway (VG-lista)	14
Poland Airplay (ZPAV)	12
Poland Dance (ZPAV)	11
Slovakia Airplay (ČNS IFPI)	3
Slovakia Singles Digital (ČNS IFPI)	38
Slovenia (SloTop50)	18
South Africa Airplay (EMA)	4
Spain (Promusicae)	43
Sweden (Sverigetopplistan)	3
Switzerland (Schweizer Hitparade)	37
UK Singles (Official Charts)	75
US Bubbling Under Hot 100 (Billboard)	16

=== Year-end charts ===
Chart (2015)	Position
Australia (ARIA)	98
Austria (Ö3 Austria Top 40)	69
Denmark (Tracklisten)	57
Germany (Official German Charts)	78
Hungary (Rádiós Top 40)	82
Sweden (Sverigetopplistan)	67

Chart (2016)	Position
Hungary (Rádiós Top 40)	44

== Certifications ==
Region	Certification	Certified units/sales
Australia (ARIA)	Platinum	70,000^{‡}
Canada (Music Canada)	2× Platinum	160,000^{‡}
Denmark (IFPI Danmark)	Platinum	60,000^{^}
Germany (BVMI)	Gold	200,000^{‡}
Italy (FIMI)	Gold	25,000^{‡}
Mexico (AMPROFON)	Gold	30,000^{‡}
New Zealand (RMNZ)	Platinum	15,000^{*}
Sweden (GLF)	2× Platinum	80,000^{‡}
United Kingdom (BPI)	Silver	200,000^{‡}
^{*} Sales figures based on certification alone.^{^} Shipments figures based on certification alone.^{‡} Sales+streaming figures based on certification alone.

== Release history ==
Region	Date	Format	Label	Ref.
Various	27 August 2015	Digital download	Ultra	
Italy	14 September 2015	Mainstream radio	Sony; Do It Yourself	
United States	15 September 2015	Mainstream radio	Columbia	
