= Love Me & Let Me Go =

Single by Ashley Tisdale

from the album Symptoms
- Released: January 25, 2019
- Recorded: 2018
- Genre: Pop
- Length: 2:46
- Label: Big Noise
- Songwriter(s): Ashley Tisdale; John Feldmann; Dylan Mclean; Whitney Phillips; Scot Stewart
- Producer(s): John Feldmann

Ashley Tisdale singles chronology
"Voices in My Head" (2018)	"Love Me & Let Me Go" (2019)

Music video
- "Love Me & Let Me Go" on YouTube

"Love Me & Let Me Go" is a song by Ashley Tisdale from her third studio album, Symptoms. It was released as the album's second and final single on January 25, 2019, through label Big Noise.

== Background and composition ==
Speaking about the meaning of the song in an interview with Entertainment Weekly, Tisdale stated:

"With ‘Love Me and Let Me Go,’ I remember just feeling really shut off, so I wrote those lyrics down in my notes app on my phone... I didn’t want to dwell on the feelings of anxiety and depression, so there wasn’t anything [in the album] that was too scary [to reveal]. I mean, the scariest part is talking about it right now."

— Ashley Tisdale, interview with Entertainment Weekly

Musically, "Love Me & Let Me Go" is a "moody" pop song that contains "electro-kissed production", a "skittering beat", and a breakdown in the song's chorus. Though the lyrics were interpreted as Tisdale demanding space from a past lover, Tisdale later revealed the song to be about her struggles with anxiety.

== Critical reception ==
Mike Nied, writing for Idolator, praised the song's chorus and called the song "sleek and sassy". Madeline Roth of MTV called the song "a much-welcome comeback from the singer-songwriter, who's giving fans a vulnerable side of herself they've never seen before."

== Music video ==
A music video was released to accompany the single on January 30, 2019. Speaking about the video, Tisdale stated "the music video represents the feelings of being trapped and needing to let go". Different stages of anxiety are symbolized in the video. The video begins with the singer sitting alone in a blacked-out room. As the video progresses, it becomes brighter, symbolizing the singer gaining control of her anxiety. The final moments show the singer levitating above the ground, having broken free.

== Track listing ==
Digital download

1. "Love Me & Let Me Go" – 2:46

== Personnel ==
Adapted from Tidal.

- Ashley Tisdale – lead artist, songwriter
- John Feldmann – songwriter, producer
- Dylan McLean – songwriter
- Scot Stewart – songwriter
- Whitney Phillips – songwriter

== Release history ==
Region	Release date	Format	Ref.
Various	January 25, 2019	Digital download	
