= The Mayor of Oyster Bay =

- Directed by: Marcy Carsey; David Israel
- Starring: Joan Blair; T.J. McCormack; Ashley Tisdale; Brian Turk
- Country of origin: United States
- Original language: English

Production
- Running time: 30 minutes

Original release
- Release: 2002

The Mayor of Oyster Bay is a 2002 film directed by Marcy Carsey and David Israel.

== Starring ==
- Joan Blair
- T.J. McCormack
- Ashley Tisdale
- Brian Turk
