= Cheerleader (Omi song) =

- Felix Jaehn remix cover

Single by Omi

from the album Me 4 U
- Released: 2012 (original); 19 May 2014 (Felix Jaehn remix)
- Recorded: 2012
- Genre: Reggae fusion (original version); deep house (Felix Jaehn remix)
- Length: 2:54 (original); 3:00 (Felix Jaehn remix)
- Label: Oufah; Ultra; Columbia
- Songwriters: Omar Samuel Pasley; Clifton Dillon; Mark Bradford; Darren Moran; Ryan Dillon; Sly Dunbar
- Producers: OMI; Clifton Dillon; Felix Jaehn

OMI singles chronology
"Cheerleader" (2012)	"Cheerleader (Felix Jaehn Remix)" (2014)	"Hula Hoop" (2015)

Music video
- "Cheerleader" on YouTube

Music video
- "Cheerleader" (Felix Jaehn Remix) on YouTube

"Cheerleader" is a song recorded by Jamaican singer Omi. The track was written and produced by OMI and Clifton Dillon, Mark Bradford, and Ryan Dillon. OMI first began developing the song in 2008, when he created its melody. It was refined over several years alongside famed Jamaican producer Clifton Dillon. It was first recorded with veteran session musicians Sly and Robbie and Dean Fraser. Released as a single on independent label Oufah, the song saw success in Jamaica, where it topped the charts, and also attracted airplay in Hawaii and Dubai. Ultra contacted two disc jockeys to produce remixed versions of the original song. The label and song's producers preferred one remix, produced by a young German DJ, Felix Jaehn, that eschewed much of the song's original instrumentation for a tropical-flavored deep house rendition, prominently featuring a trumpet, a conga beat, and piano. A remix extended play was released in May 2014 by Ultra, which began to first see commercial success that fall.

"Cheerleader" achieved commercial success in 2015, when it reached number one in 20 countries including the United States, the United Kingdom, Australia, Canada, France, Mexico, Ireland, Sweden, and Germany.

== Background ==
OMI—the stage name of Omar Samuel Pasley—was born in the parish of Clarendon, Jamaica. He grew up with a love of American hip hop, but grew more interested in melody after listening to singers like John Legend, Nat King Cole, and Sam Cooke. He first developed "Cheerleader" in 2008, when he woke up humming its melody. "It was like a little Jamaican nursery rhyme, like 'one, two, buckle my shoe,' that kind of thing—'ring game' is what we'd call it. The rest of the song just fell into place like a jigsaw puzzle", he later recalled. The following year, he was discovered by producer Clifton "Specialist" Dillon, an influential figure in the Jamaican music industry, who subsequently became his manager and collaborator. He originally wrote only two verses for the song, imagining it as an interlude for an album. Dillon convinced him to create a third verse, and the song began to take shape. Prolific Jamaican rhythm section Sly and Robbie and veteran saxophonist Dean Fraser contributed to the original recording, which was first issued in 2012 on Oufah, an independent label in Kingston.

The following April, Patrick Moxey, president of U.S. electronic music label Ultra Music, discovered the song. According to Moxey, he was vacationing in Montreal when he first heard the song whilst listening to radio promoter showcase songs popular in the Caribbean. Meanwhile, Salaam Remi, an American hip hop producer that owned an imprint at Sony, was also interested in bringing the song to a wider audience. Ultra signed Pasley to a recording contract in late 2013. It soon began conversations with two disc jockeys—Brooklyn dancehall and hip-hop producer Ricky Blaze and German producer Felix Jaehn. They sent them "Cheerleader" and an a cappella version to build remixes. Jaehn enjoyed the song's vocals, but felt its instrumentation did not attune to its "feel-good" essence; Jaehn hoped to craft a remix they deemed more "danceable." The Jaehn remix was completed in January 2014, and released that May on Ultra. The song would also see considerable use on Musical.ly, being lip synced to by multiple users.

== Composition ==
"Cheerleader"
The remix of "Cheerleader" emphasizes trumpet, bongos, and piano over a deep house beat.

The remix version incorporates a house beat with additional trumpet, bongos and a "samba-like" piano part. It also speeds up Pasley's original vocal track, and eschews much of the original rhythm of the song with digital instrumentation. Fraser's saxophone is replaced by a sample of a trumpet. These attributes were considered more palatable for international audiences. Its genre has been variously described as representative of deep house, reggae fusion, and electro–ska.

The song's lyrics center on the protagonist's joy at finding a "cheerleader"—a romantic companion that will be a support system for him, and is "always there when I need her." While the song's lyrics relate heavily to romance, Pasley considered it timeless: "It speaks to more than just a significant other. It's dedicated to anyone who is that support system."

== Music videos ==
The song's original music video, directed by Tim Cash, was shot in Oregon on a small budget. A second video, directed by Scorpio 21, was shot at Red Bones Café in Saint Andrew in January 2015.

As the song began gaining worldwide success, a new music video for the Jaehn remix was commissioned. It was shot on location in Haulover Beach, Florida, which was designed to capture the song's essence, described by Pasley as a "constant warm sunshine-playful vibe." The clip was directed by Lenny Bass, who previously directed videos for Fantasia and Gavin DeGraw.

As of June 2023, this music video of the remix has received over 1.2 billion views on YouTube.

== Chart performance ==
The remix of "Cheerleader" was a gradual global smash single; it first topped charts in European countries before making its way to the United States. The original track was first placed on reggae charts in Hawaii and Dubai in 2012, after which it became a hit in his home country of Jamaica. Dillon "strategically planned" the song's rise to fame, having released the song to "community sound systems in Miami and disc jockeys that toured with [Italian reggae artist] Alborosie."

Upon its remix, the song began gaining traction in Swedish markets, first through the streaming service Spotify. It soon spread to Italy and France. In January 2015, Sony Music, the conglomerate that owns Columbia and Ultra, named it their "Song of the Month"; as a result, all subsidiaries of the company put forth additional promotion of the single. By that time, the song had peaked at number one in five European territories.

In March, a deal was signed with Syco Music, a label owned and operated by British music mogul Simon Cowell, to promote and distribute the song throughout the United Kingdom. The song's popularity on streaming media in the UK brought forth its official release date there to mid-April. It shortly thereafter debuted on the country's pop charts and was assisted by a viral video of Cowell singing the song. By early May, the song had topped the UK Singles Chart; four weeks in, it broke chart records as the longest-running single by a Jamaican artist.

The song debuted on the Billboard Hot 100 in the United States in early May, as the song peaked in the UK. The release of a revised music video to the song catapulted it to the top of music identification application Shazam's worldwide charts. Application data predicted that the song would top the Hot 100 at some point; the song eventually reached number one in the U.S. on 13 July. It remained on the top of the chart for six non-consecutive weeks, until finally being replaced by The Weeknd's "Can't Feel My Face". It was later named Billboard's Song of the Summer.

Much of the song's rise to prominence was attributed to its performance on streaming services. On Spotify, the song attracted over 910 million plays (as of January 2019). Outside of national charts, it peaked at number one on the iTunes Store in over 55 markets. "Cheerleader" was the most streamed song of 2015 in the UK, racking up 71.7 million streams throughout the year.

== Reception ==
While Chris Molanphy of Slate found the song's lyrics "laughably retrograde", he praised the chorus as "universally relatable and cross-culturally memorable."

Nick Messitte, a Forbes contributor, opined that the song has brought deep house music into the mainstream of the United States.

== Usage in media ==
The track appears in the streaming service, Just Dance Unlimited, as an exclusive for Just Dance 2016.

== Track listing ==
- Digital download
1. "Cheerleader" (Felix Jaehn remix radio edit) – 3:00
- Digital download
1. "Cheerleader" (featuring Kid Ink) (Felix Jaehn vs. Salaam Remi remix) – 3:01
- Digital download
1. "Cheerleader" (featuring Nicky Jam) (Felix Jaehn remix) – 3:00
- US digital download
1. "Cheerleader" (Ricky Blaze remix) – 3:03
2. "Cheerleader" – 2:54
- German CD single
1. "Cheerleader" (Felix Jaehn remix radio edit) – 3:00
2. "Cheerleader" – 2:54

== Charts ==
=== Weekly charts ===
==== Felix Jaehn remix ====
Chart (2014–2015)	Peak position
Australia (ARIA)	1
Austria (Ö3 Austria Top 40)	1
Belgium (Ultratop 50 Flanders)	1
Belgium (Ultratop 50 Wallonia)	1
Brazil Hot 100 Airplay (Billboard Brasil)	1
Canada Hot 100 (Billboard)	1
Colombia (National-Report)	6
Czech Republic Airplay (ČNS IFPI)	1
Czech Republic Singles Digital (ČNS IFPI)	5
Denmark (Tracklisten)	1
Euro Digital Song Sales (Billboard)	1
Finland (Suomen virallinen lista)	13
France (SNEP)	1
France Airplay (SNEP)	1
Germany (GfK)	1
Hungary (Dance Top 40)	16
Hungary (Rádiós Top 40)	1
Hungary (Single Top 40)	3
Ireland (IRMA)	1
Israel International Airplay (Media Forest)	3
Italy (FIMI)	2
Japan Hot 100 (Billboard)	46
Lebanon (OLT 20)	3
Mexico (Billboard Ingles Airplay)	1
Mexico Anglo (Monitor Latino)	1
Netherlands (Dutch Top 40)	1
Netherlands (Single Top 100)	1
New Zealand (Recorded Music NZ)	3
Norway (VG-lista)	5
Poland Airplay (ZPAV)	1
Romania (Airplay 100)	21
Scottish Singles Sales (Official Charts)	1
Slovakia Airplay (ČNS IFPI)	1
Slovakia Singles Digital (ČNS IFPI)	4
Slovenia (SloTop50)	1
South Africa Airplay (EMA)	1
Spain (Promusicae)	3
Sweden (Sverigetopplistan)	1
Switzerland (Schweizer Hitparade)	1
UK Singles (Official Charts)	1
US Billboard Hot 100	1
US Adult Contemporary (Billboard)	11
US Adult Pop Airplay (Billboard)	6
US Dance Airplay (Billboard)	2
US Latin Airplay (Billboard) featuring Nicky Jam	13
US Pop Airplay (Billboard)	1
US Rhythmic Airplay (Billboard)	1

=== Year-end charts ===
==== Felix Jaehn remix ====
Chart (2014)	Position
Sweden (Sverigetopplistan)	21

Chart (2015)	Position
Australia (ARIA)	2
Austria (Ö3 Austria Top 40)	1
Belgium (Ultratop Flanders)	2
Belgium (Ultratop Wallonia)	1
Canada (Canadian Hot 100)	3
Colombia (National-Report)	26
Denmark (Tracklisten)	2
Germany (Official German Charts)	1
Hungary (Dance Top 40)	43
Hungary (Rádiós Top 40)	12
Hungary (Single Top 40)	20
Israel (Media Forest)	14
Italy (FIMI)	3
Netherlands (Dutch Top 40)	4
Netherlands (Single Top 100)	1
New Zealand (Recorded Music NZ)	5
Poland (ZPAV)	2
Slovenia (SloTop50)	5
Spain (PROMUSICAE)	2
Sweden (Sverigetopplistan)	6
Switzerland (Schweizer Hitparade)	2
UK Singles (Official Charts Company)	2
US Billboard Hot 100	11
US Adult Contemporary (Billboard)	25
US Adult Top 40 (Billboard)	27
US Dance/Mix Show Airplay (Billboard)	10
US Mainstream Top 40 (Billboard)	14
US Rhythmic (Billboard)	13

Chart (2016)	Position
Brazil (Brasil Hot 100)	6
Canada (Canadian Hot 100)	97
France (SNEP)	108
Hungary (Rádiós Top 40)	88

=== Decade-end charts ===
Chart (2010–2019)	Position
Australia (ARIA)	67
Germany (Official German Charts)	42
Netherlands (Single Top 100)	15
UK Singles (Official Charts Company)	22
US Billboard Hot 100	83

== Certifications ==
Region	Certification	Certified units/sales
Australia (ARIA)	6× Platinum	420,000^{‡}
Austria (IFPI Austria)	Platinum	30,000^{*}
Belgium (BRMA)	2× Platinum	40,000^{‡}
Canada (Music Canada)	Diamond	800,000^{‡}
Denmark (IFPI Danmark)	5× Platinum	450,000^{‡}
France (SNEP)	Diamond	250,000^{*}
Germany (BVMI)	4× Platinum	1,200,000^{‡}
Italy (FIMI)	7× Platinum	350,000^{‡}
Mexico (AMPROFON)	Diamond+2× Platinum+Gold	450,000^{‡}
New Zealand (RMNZ)	7× Platinum	210,000^{‡}
Spain (Promusicae)	4× Platinum	160,000^{‡}
Sweden (GLF)	7× Platinum	280,000^{‡}
United Kingdom (BPI)	6× Platinum	3,600,000^{‡}
United States (RIAA)	3× Platinum	2,100,000
^{*} Sales figures based on certification alone.^{‡} Sales+streaming figures based on certification alone.

== Radio and release history ==
Country	Date	Format	Version	Label	Ref.
Jamaica	2012	Digital download	"Cheerleader"	Oufah	
Ireland	19 May 2014	Digital download	"Cheerleader (Felix Jaehn Remix)"	Ultra; Columbia	
United States	20 May 2014	Digital download	"Cheerleader (Felix Jaehn Remix)"	Ultra; Columbia	
Australia	12 December 2014	Digital download	"Cheerleader (Felix Jaehn Remix)"	Ultra; Columbia	
United Kingdom	12 April 2015	Digital download	"Cheerleader (Felix Jaehn Remix)"	Ultra; Columbia	
United States	5 May 2015	Contemporary hit radio	"Cheerleader (Felix Jaehn Remix)"	Ultra; Columbia	
United States	5 May 2015	Rhythmic contemporary	"Cheerleader (Felix Jaehn Remix)"	Ultra; Columbia	
