= Stuck with U =

2020 single by Ariana Grande and Justin Bieber

Single by Ariana Grande and Justin Bieber
- Released: May 8, 2020
- Recorded: 2020
- Studio: The Freddy Wexler Company (Los Angeles, CA); Chumba Meadows (Tarzana, CA); Cherry Beach Sound (Toronto, ON)
- Genre: Pop; R&B
- Length: 3:48
- Label: Silent; Def Jam; Republic
- Songwriters: Ariana Grande; Justin Bieber; Freddy Wexler; Gian Stone; Whitney Phillips; Scott Braun; Skyler Stonestreet
- Producers: Freddy Wexler; Gian Stone; Ariana Grande

Ariana Grande singles chronology
"Time" (2020)	"Stuck with U" (2020)	"Rain on Me" (2020)

Justin Bieber singles chronology
"Lean on Me" (2020)	"Stuck with U" (2020)	"Holy" (2020)

Music video
- "Stuck with U" on YouTube

"Stuck with U" is a song by American singer Ariana Grande and Canadian singer Justin Bieber. It was released through Republic Records, Def Jam Recordings, and Silent Records Ventures as a single on May 8, 2020. Both artists wrote the song alongside producers Freddy Wexler and Gian Stone alongside Whitney Phillips, their manager, Scooter Braun, and Skyler Stonestreet. Primarily a pop and R&B song, "Stuck with U" features elements of doo-wop. "Stuck with U" marks the second collaboration between Grande and Bieber, following their duet on the remix of the latter's chart-topping single, "What Do You Mean?".

The song debuted atop the Billboard Hot 100, chart issue dated May 23, 2020, becoming Grande's third and Bieber's sixth U.S. number-one single. In addition, both artists debut at number one on the chart for a third time each. The song also debuted at number one on the Rolling Stone Top 100, chart issue dated May 21, 2020, becoming Grande's second and Bieber's first number-one single. It is certified double platinum by the RIAA. Internationally, The song also topped the charts in Canada, Lebanon, Malaysia, New Zealand, Israel, and Singapore; and reached the top-ten in 17 other countries. "Stuck with U" also won the award for Best Music Video From Home at the 2020 MTV Video Music Awards and the award for Favorite Music Collaboration at the 2021 Kids' Choice Awards. As of August 2021, the song has raised over $3.5 million for the First Responders Children's Foundation, going directly to thousands of first responders' families around the U.S.

== Background and cause ==
On April 30, 2020, Bieber tweeted "Special announcement tomorrow at 10 am pst...", following which Grande also tweeted in anticipation of it. The next day, the artists took to their social media to announce the release of their song on May 8, 2020. It first premiered at 21:00 PDT on May 7, 2020. All net proceeds from the track would be donated to the First Responders Children's Foundation. A partnership negotiated by Up To More Good. The money would fund scholarships of children of frontline workers whose lives have been affected by the COVID-19 pandemic. During an ASCAP interview, co-writers Gian Stone and Whitney Phillips revealed that the song was originally meant to be a solo performance and that it was Grande's idea to turn it into a duet with Bieber.

== Composition ==
Musically, "Stuck with U" is a '50s-influenced retro pop and R&B ballad that contains elements of doo-wop music. Lyrically, it is a "romantic" song about being grateful to spend time with a loved one. "Stuck with U" was written in 6/8 time in the key of A♭ major, with a tempo of 60 beats per minute. Grande's vocal range spans three octaves, from E♭_{3} to G♯_{6}.

== Critical reception ==
Anna Gaca of Pitchfork stated "Stuck with U" is "merely serviceable as a pop song" but "a big upgrade from that other product of rich-people lockdown culture: the celebrities singing 'Imagine'. Instead of a bad take on a hoary classic, Grande and Bieber offer a new song with a pleasantly retro doo-wop vibe. Instead of Pollyannaish optimism, they sound a note of resignation."

== Commercial performance ==
"Stuck with U" debuted at number one on the Billboard Hot 100, becoming Bieber's sixth and Grande's third number one single. The song is also both Bieber's and Grande's third song to debut at number one, tying both artists with Mariah Carey and Drake for the most songs that debuted at number one. Grande later broke this tie with "Rain on Me" debuting at number one on the Billboard Hot 100. Grande also became the first artist to have their first three number-ones debut at the top spot. The song sales was aided by a variety of physical/digital combination offerings during the tracking week, including copies autographed by Grande and Bieber. Consumers could also purchase cassette, CD and vinyl singles, each with a digital download. "Stuck With U" is also the third female-male duet in over a year since "Señorita" by Shawn Mendes and Camila Cabello and "Shallow" by Lady Gaga and Bradley Cooper to top the Hot 100. The song also debuted at number one on the Digital Songs chart with 108,000 downloads, becoming the first song to crack over 100,000 downloads in the first week since "Me!" by Taylor Swift featuring Brendon Urie (193,000 downloads). The song is Grande's sixth chart-topper on the said chart, also Bieber's twelfth, surpassing Drake as the male artist with the most, and overall the third artist, behind Swift and Rihanna. In its second week on the Hot 100, "Stuck with U" dropped to number 13.

"Stuck with U" debuted at number two on the Irish Singles Chart, becoming Bieber's 20th and Grande's 15th top ten hit; Bieber also becomes the artist with most top fifty hits in history of the said chart surpassing Eminem and Rihanna who have scored 52 each.

"Stuck with U" debuted at number one on The Rolling Stone Top 100, becoming Bieber's first and Grande's second number one single. The song is also Grande's second song to debut at number one making her the first female artist to earn two number one debuts on the Rolling Stone 100 singles chart.

== Billboard Hot 100 controversy ==
On the same day as the release of "Stuck with U", rapper 6ix9ine, who had been incarcerated but had earlier in the month been released to home confinement due to the COVID-19 pandemic, released his comeback single "Gooba", which debuted atop the Billboard Streaming Songs chart, and peaked at number three on the Billboard Hot 100, on the week dated May 23, 2020. The rapper took to social media afterwards to accuse Billboard of "chart manipulation" and accuse both Grande and Bieber of "buying" their way to number one on the chart. In an Instagram post, 6ix9ine alleged that the artists used six credit cards to buy 30,000 copies of "Stuck with U" without providing evidence. Grande and Bieber both denied the allegations. Grande and Bieber's manager Scooter Braun would address 6ix9ine's claims that his streams didn't count, stating that "he [6ix9ine] is counting his global streams and this is a domestic chart so only domestic streams count". Braun also added that the last-minute disclosure of 60,000 units was the result of their team strategy to keep the numbers quiet until the end of the week, and pointed out that "using six credit cards to buy 30K" is impossible by stating "the rules are clear one credit card can buy max 4 copies". Bieber defended Grande by reposting Braun's statement on Instagram stories adding that "this is my song with Ariana Grande and I'm honored to work with her to help raise money for a great cause. If you gonna say her name make sure you say mine because it's our song".

6ix9ine made a subsequent video addressing Grande, in which he said he wasn't coming after her on a personal level but Billboard, despite his previous statements speculating against Grande and Bieber.

=== Billboard's response ===
Billboard released a statement on May 18, 2020, the same day 6ix9ine made the accusations, to explain the results. Billboard stated that 6ix9ine's "six credit cards" claim was inaccurate, as bulk purchases are recognized and removed from the final sales total. They also stated that the Hot 100 forecast he had referenced in an earlier Instagram post prior to the release of that week's chart reveal was not created by them and that they do not distribute any of their rankings to labels, management, or artist. About the discrepancy between YouTube's visible play count for "Gooba", over 180 million at that moment, and the number of streams Billboard counted for the song, 55.3 million, they explain "counts for a video on its YouTube page are for global plays, and absent any other auditing filters [...] Billboard counts only U.S. based plays for its charts."

== Music videos ==
The accompanying music video was released on May 8, 2020, alongside the song's official release. It consists of clips sent in by young fans who would have attended prom in 2020 but are unable to do so due to the COVID-19 pandemic, as well as people who are stuck inside spending time with loved ones. The video was directed by Rory Kramer and Alfredo Flores, with Grande, Bieber, and Braun contributing clips. It also features Kendall and Kylie Jenner, Demi Lovato, 2 Chainz, Paula Abdul, Stephen and Ayesha Curry, Elizabeth Gillies, Gwyneth Paltrow, Eric Stonestreet, Chance the Rapper, Kate Hudson, Lil Dicky, GaTa, Sheel Mohnot, Michael Bublé, Jaden Smith, Ashton Kutcher and Mila Kunis, as well as Bieber with his wife Hailey Bieber. Grande used the video to reveal her new relationship. She was spotted embracing a man towards the end of the video, and a couple of seconds later, the man was revealed to be Dalton Gomez, a real estate agent who eventually became Grande's husband before their divorce in 2024.

Bieber also posted a lyric video with an animation of the house drawn in the cover. The video was created by Katia Temkin and the artwork of the house was made by Liana Finck. A fan-made Prom Scenes video that shows prom scenes from movies was released on Bieber's YouTube channel on May 9. On May 11, he released a Mother's Day Edition of the music video.

The music video earned two VMA nominations at the 2020 MTV Video Music Awards, for Best Collaboration and Best Music Video from Home, winning the latter.

== Accolades ==
Awards and nominations for "Stuck with U"
Year	Organization	Award	Result	Ref(s)
2020	MTV Millennial Awards Brazil	International Collaboration	Nominated	
2020	MTV Video Music Awards	Best Collaboration	Nominated	
2020	MTV Video Music Awards	Best Music Video From Home	Won	
2020	People's Choice Awards	Song of 2020	Nominated	
2021	Kids' Choice Awards	Favorite Music Collaboration	Won	

== Credits and personnel ==
Credits adapted from Tidal.

- Ariana Grande – vocals, songwriting, production, vocal production, engineering
- Justin Bieber – vocals, songwriting
- Gian Stone – production, songwriting, programming, engineering, guitar, keyboards, percussion
- Freddy Wexler – additional production, songwriting, engineering, percussion, programming
- Whitney Phillips – songwriting
- Skyler Stonestreet – songwriting
- Scooter Braun – songwriting
- Bianca Atterberry – backing vocals
- Kurt Thum – organ
- Josh Gudwin – engineering, mixing, vocal production
- Elijah Marrett-Hitch – assistant mixing
- Billy Hickey – engineering
- Devin Nakao – engineering
- Jason Evigan – engineering
- Lionel Crasta – engineering
- Rafael Fadul – engineering
- Randy Merrill – mastering

== Charts ==
=== Weekly charts ===
Weekly chart performance
Chart (2020)	Peak position
Australia (ARIA)	3
Austria (Ö3 Austria Top 40)	8
Belgium (Ultratop 50 Flanders)	16
Belgium (Ultratop 50 Wallonia)	11
Canada Hot 100 (Billboard)	1
Canada AC (Billboard)	30
Canada CHR/Top 40 (Billboard)	17
Canada Hot AC (Billboard)	16
Croatia (HRT)	13
Czech Republic Singles Digital (ČNS IFPI)	6
Denmark (Tracklisten)	5
Estonia (Eesti Tipp-40)	7
Finland (Suomen virallinen lista)	12
France (SNEP)	29
Germany (GfK)	19
Global 200 (Billboard)	60
Greece International (IFPI)	8
Hungary (Single Top 40)	9
Hungary (Stream Top 40)	5
Iceland (Tónlistinn)	8
Ireland (IRMA)	2
Israel (Media Forest)	1
Italy (FIMI)	23
Japan Hot 100 (Billboard)	29
Lebanon (OLT20)	1
Lithuania (AGATA)	5
Malaysia (RIM)	1
Netherlands (Dutch Top 40)	6
Netherlands (Single Top 100)	3
New Zealand (Recorded Music NZ)	1
Norway (VG-lista)	4
Panama (PRODUCE)	40
Poland Airplay (ZPAV)	45
Portugal (AFP)	6
Scottish Singles Sales (Official Charts)	2
Singapore (RIAS)	1
South Korea (Gaon)	54
Spain (PROMUSICAE)	34
Sweden (Sverigetopplistan)	8
Switzerland (Schweizer Hitparade)	7
UK Singles (Official Charts)	4
US Billboard Hot 100	1
US Adult Contemporary (Billboard)	21
US Adult Pop Airplay (Billboard)	13
US Dance Airplay (Billboard)	39
US Pop Airplay (Billboard)	14
US Rhythmic Airplay (Billboard)	26
US Rolling Stone Top 100	1

=== Year-end charts ===
2020 yearly chart performance for "Stuck with U"
Chart (2020)	Position
Australia (ARIA)	52
Belgium (Ultratop Flanders)	75
Canada (Canadian Hot 100)	66
Iceland (Tónlistinn)	32
Malaysia (RIM)	5
Netherlands (Dutch Top 40)	54
Netherlands (Single Top 100)	68
New Zealand (Recorded Music NZ)	37
Portugal (AFP)	104
South Korea (Gaon)	117
UK Singles (OCC)	100
US Billboard Hot 100	80

2021 yearly chart performance for "Stuck with U"
Chart (2021)	Position
South Korea (Gaon)	153

== Certifications ==
Certifications
Region	Certification	Certified units/sales
Australia (ARIA)	4× Platinum	280,000^{‡}
Austria (IFPI Austria)	Gold	15,000^{‡}
Belgium (BRMA)	Gold	20,000^{‡}
Brazil (Pro-Música Brasil)	2× Diamond	320,000^{‡}
Canada (Music Canada)	4× Platinum	320,000^{‡}
Denmark (IFPI Danmark)	Platinum	90,000^{‡}
France (SNEP)	Gold	100,000^{‡}
Italy (FIMI)	Gold	35,000^{‡}
New Zealand (RMNZ)	4× Platinum	120,000^{‡}
Norway (IFPI Norway)	Platinum	60,000^{‡}
Poland (ZPAV)	Platinum	50,000^{‡}
Portugal (AFP)	Platinum	10,000^{‡}
Spain (Promusicae)	Platinum	60,000^{‡}
United Kingdom (BPI)	Platinum	600,000^{‡}
United States (RIAA)	2× Platinum	2,000,000^{‡}
Streaming
Japan (RIAJ)	Gold	50,000,000^{†}
Sweden (GLF)	Platinum	8,000,000^{†}
^{‡} Sales+streaming figures based on certification alone.^{†} Streaming-only figures based on certification alone.

== Release history ==
Release dates and formats
Region	Date	Format(s)	Label(s)	Ref.
Various	May 8, 2020	Digital download; streaming	Def Jam; Republic; RBMG	
United States	May 11, 2020	Adult contemporary radio; hot adult contemporary radio; modern contemporary radio	Def Jam; Republic	
Various	May 12, 2020	7-inch; cassette; CD	Def Jam; Republic; RBMG	
United States	May 12, 2020	Contemporary hit radio; rhythmic contemporary radio	Def Jam; Republic	
Italy	May 15, 2020	Radio airplay	Universal	

== See also ==
- List of Billboard Hot 100 number-one singles of 2020
- List of Billboard Hot 100 top-ten singles in 2020
- List of Billboard Digital Song Sales number ones of 2020
- List of Canadian Hot 100 number-one singles of 2020
- List of UK top-ten singles in 2020
- List of number-one songs of 2020 (Malaysia)
- List of number-one singles from the 2020s (New Zealand)
- List of number-one songs of 2020 (Singapore)
