= DC to Light =

Studio album by Morgan Page
- Released: 9 June 2015
- Recorded: 2014–15
- Genre: Progressive house
- Label: Nettwerk Productions
- Producer: Morgan Page

Morgan Page chronology
In the Air (2012)	DC to Light (2015)

Singles from DC to Light
- 1. "Open Heart" Released: June 29, 2015; 2. "Safe Till Tomorrow" Released: May 20, 2016; 3. "Running Wild" Released: October 28, 2016

DC to Light is the fourth studio album by American DJ, Morgan Page. It was released on 9 June 2015, via Nettwerk Productions. The album is charted on the Billboard 200, Top Dance/Electronic Albums, Independent Albums and Heatseekers Albums charts.

== Background ==
The album was recorded using electricity harnessed by solar panels at his home studio. Jon O'Brien of Music Is My Oxygen, reviewed the album as "largely more concerned with massive bass drops, irritating high-pitched synths and generic four-to-the-floor beats".

== Track listing ==
No.	Title	Length
1.	"No Ordinary Life" (featuring Angela McCluskey)	3:27
2.	"Open Heart" (featuring Lissie)	4:04
3.	"Running Wild" (featuring The Oddictions and Britt Daley)	3:30
4.	"Against the World" (featuring Michael S.)	3:48
5.	"Trigger" (featuring Rosette & Dirty Radio)	3:22
6.	"Strike" (featuring Whitney Phillips)	3:52
7.	"Save You" (featuring David Jackson)	4:08
8.	"The One I Love" (featuring Polina)	3:46
9.	"Think of You" (featuring Meiko)	4:59
10.	"Safe Till Tomorrow" (featuring Angelika Vee)	3:50
11.	"We Receive You" (featuring Carnage and Candice Pillay)	3:42
12.	"Farewell" (featuring Chris Batson)	3:18
13.	"Open Heart" (featuring Lissie) (Bonus Acoustic Mix)	3:41
14.	"Safe Till Tomorrow" (featuring Angelika Vee) (Bonus Acoustic Mix)	2:34
Total length:		52:02

== Charts ==
Charts	Peak positions
US Billboard 200	154
US Top Dance/Electronic Albums	3
US Heatseekers Albums	1
US Independent Albums	9
