= Lil Kiiwi =

Studio album by Kiiara
- Released: October 9, 2020
- Genre: Electropop
- Length: 37:55
- Label: Atlantic; Warner
- Producer: Andrew Cedar; Arkadi; Brenton Duvall; Christina Galligan; Emi Dragoi; Felix Snow; Innr Chld; Jason Evigan; Jussifer; King Henry; Louis Schoorl; Mag; M-Phazes; Omega; Sebastian Torres; Tim Randolph; Zach Skelton

Kiiara chronology
Low Kii Savage (2016)	Lil Kiiwi (2020)

Singles from Lil Kiiwi
- 1. "I Still Do" Released: July 17, 2020; 2. "Never Let You" Released: August 21, 2020; 3. "Numb" Released: September 8, 2020; 4. "So Sick" Released: October 9, 2020

Lil Kiiwi is the debut studio album by American singer-songwriter Kiiara. It was released on October 9, 2020, through Atlantic Records, and Warner Music Group. The album came four years after her debut EP Low Kii Savage, as well as a string of four singles: "I Still Do", "Never Let You", "Numb" and "So Sick".

== Background ==
The album was followed by her debut extended play, Low Kii Savage (2016). Lil Kiiwi was announced a week prior to its release, with the revealing of the artwork and track listing. "Gold", peaking at number 13 on the Billboard Hot 100 approximately a year after its release, was released as Kiiara's first single through Atlantic Records on October 26, 2015. The single has been certified multi-platinum in several countries including the United States, Australia, and Canada. "Feels" was released on January 15, 2016 as the second single from the EP. "Whippin" was released on April 12, 2017, which features Kiiara's long-time collaborator Felix Snow as the guest artist.

== Promotion ==
Fans who pre-ordered the album were given instant access to select tracks, including "Numb", "I Still Do", and "Never Let You", along with earlier singles like "Whippin", "Feels", and "Gold".

=== Singles ===
"I Still Do" was released on July 17, 2020 as the lead single from the album. The song was written by Justin Tranter, Ali Tamposi, and Jason Evigan alongside Kiiara, and was accompanied by a music video. The single "Never Let You" was released on August 21, 2020 and lyrically talks about her wanting to quit music. A collaboration with DeathbyRomy and Pvris named "Numb" was released on September 8, 2020. A collaboration with Blackbear named "So Sick" was released as the following single, also counting with a music video. A remix of the track by Danish DJ Martin Jensen" was also unveiled. "Open My Mouth" was originally released as the lead single from Kiiara's debut album; however, the song was included on the deluxe edition of Lil Kiiwi, along with "Messy", as well as "Tennessee" and "Intention" from Low Kii Savage.

== Critical reception ==
Professional ratings
Review scores
Source	Rating
Pitchfork	6.1/10

Pitchfork described Lil Kiiwi as "a promising reintroduction to Kiiara", praising her move toward lo-fi and electro-pop sounds while noting that the album establishes her place in modern pop, provided she avoids predictable clichés.

== Track listing ==
Lil Kiiwi track listing
No.	Title	Writer(s)	Producer(s)	Length
1.	"So Sick" (featuring Blackbear)	Kiara Saulters; Sasha Yatchenko; Matthew Musto; Wiizbach; Arkadi; Johnny Yukon; King Henry	Dekku; Arkadi	2:31
2.	"Feels"	Saulters; Brenton Duvall; Felix Snow; Blaise Riley; Singer-Vine	Duvall; Snow	3:02
3.	"Brightside"	Jim Lavigne; Esther Zyskind; Andrew Cedar	Jason Agel	2:20
4.	"Don't Get Confused"	Sebastian Torres; Christina Galligan	Torres; Galligan	2:35
5.	"Whippin" (featuring Felix Snow)	Saulters; Vine; Kurtis McKenzie	Snow	2:41
6.	"I Still Do"	Saulters; Justin Tranter; Ali Tamposi; Evigan	Evigan	3:10
7.	"Gold"	Saulters; Singer-Vine; Snow	Snow	3:45
8.	"Empty"	Saulters; Zach Skelton; Livvi Franc; Eben Wares; Casey Smith	Skelton	2:39
9.	"Never Let You"	Saulters; Omega; Tim Edgar	Arkadi; Omega; Randolph	3:12
10.	"Numb" (featuring DeathbyRomy and Pvris)	Saulters; Lyndsey Gunnulfsen; Romy Flores; Michael Schulz; Marco Borrego; Louis Schoorl; Melanie Fontana	Schoorl; Mag	3:12
11.	"Accidental"	Saulters; Franc; Emi Dragoi	King Henry; Arkadi; Dragoi	3:14
12.	"Two Thumbs"	Saulters; Mark Landon; Leland; Chloe Angelides	M-Phazes	2:57
13.	"Bad One"	Jussi Karvinen; John Mitchell; Delacey	Jussifer	2:29
Total length:				37:55

Lil Kiiwi (Deluxe)
No.	Title	Writer(s)	Producer(s)	Length
14.	"Messy"	Yatchenko; Jake Torrey; Rollo Spreckley; Noah Conrad	Conrad	2:50
15.	"Tennessee"	Saulters; Singer-Vine; Snow; Niles Hollowell-Dhar	Snow	4:20
16.	"Intention"	Saulters; Bryan Jarett; Dan Ullman	Casper & B.	3:49
17.	"Open My Mouth"	Saulters; Ian Kirkpatrick; Amy Allen; Joseph Spargur	Kickpatrick	2:36
Total length:				48:51

== Certifications ==
Certifications and sales for Lil Kiiwi
Region	Certification	Certified units/sales
Canada (Music Canada)	Gold	40,000^{‡}
United States (RIAA)	Gold	500,000^{‡}
^{‡} Sales+streaming figures based on certification alone.
