= Voices in My Head (Ashley Tisdale song) =

Single by Ashley Tisdale

from the album Symptoms
- Released: November 8, 2018
- Recorded: 2018
- Genre: Indie pop
- Length: 3:19
- Label: Big Noise
- Songwriters: Ashley Tisdale; John Feldmann; Whitney Phillips
- Producer: John Feldmann

Ashley Tisdale singles chronology
"Crank It Up" (2009)	"Voices in My Head" (2018)	"Love Me & Let Me Go" (2019)

Music video
- "Voices in My Head" on YouTube

"Voices in My Head" is a song by Ashley Tisdale from her third studio album, Symptoms. The song was written by Tisdale, Whitney Phillips and John Feldmann, while the latter produced the track. It was released as the album's lead single on November 8, 2018, through label Big Noise.

== Background and release ==
Tisdale released her second studio album Guilty Pleasure (2009) via Warner Bros. Records. Described by Tisdale as a "rocker and edgier" album, it generated mixed reviews, with a 54% rating on Metacritic. It debuted at number 12 on the Billboard 200, selling 25,000 copies in the first week; this was significantly lower than the first-week sales for her previous album Headstrong (2007). Promotion for the album ended in the end of that year, following the release of the album's second single "Crank It Up", and, in order to start focusing on her career as an actress and producer, Tisdale decided to end her record deal with Warner Bros. Records.

While promoting the film Scary Movie 5 (2013), in which she starred, Tisdale said in an interview to MTV that she was inspired to create music again and confirmed that since 2012 she has been recording for her third studio album. She hopes to "surprise people a little bit, [with] something different from what [she has] done before". Tisdale became engaged to musician Christopher French in August 2013 and they began working together on music for her third studio album. On December 9, 2013, Tisdale announced the release of a song titled "You're Always Here", her first release on music since 2009. However, the song was not promoted to radio and Tisdale eventually paused working on the album because she "wasn't excited about anything [she] was doing" and began adventuring into other ventures such as makeup and clothing lines.

In 2016, Tisdale relaunched her YouTube channel and began posting acoustic cover versions of hit songs, collaborating with other artists such as Vanessa Hudgens, Lea Michele, Echosmith's Sydney Sierota and her husband Chris French The success of the Paramore's "Still into You" cover featuring Chris French led Tisdale to release it as a promotional single in 2016. Early in 2018, Tisdale released an extended play titled Music Sessions, Vol. 1 containing a few of the covers she originally recorded for her YouTube channel.

Later in 2018, Tisdale signed with newly-launched label Big Noise and resumed work on her third studio album, which was announced to be titled Symptoms. On October 18, 2018, Tisdale announced on her Instagram page that she would be releasing the track "Voices in My Head" as the lead single off her third studio album on November 8, 2018, and also posted online the official cover art for the single.

== Composition and lyrical content ==
"Voices in My Head" is an indie pop song written by Tisdale, Whitney Phillips and John Feldmann. On the track, Tisdale discusses her insecurities and vulnerabilities, related to the anxiety and depression she suffers from, and also describes how her lover provides the support she needs in order to keep her grounded. Tisdale had been silently fighting anxiety and depression for years, so working on the track and the rest of the album was therapeutic for her. When asked by Paper Magazine on November 9, 2018, what had inspired her to write the song and the rest of the album, Tisdale claimed:

When it comes to something like depression, and someone were to be like, "Hey, who here has depression?" Not a lot of hands go up. It's because there's a stigma about that word. I am a naturalist and I did have depression, but I never took anything for it, I just kind of got my way through it, but I think we have to stop putting these words on us. We have to let go of it and not give it so much power. It's okay to just be okay, and to know that it's okay that you might have depression or you might go through depressive periods. I want people to be feel like they're not alone. "Oh, Ashley goes through this too. I don't feel so alone at home." I didn't want to dwell on it [with the music].

— Ashley Tisdale

With "Voices in My Head" specifically the singer aims to capture all the negativity she had struggled with. The track's melody revolves into "over a simple, catchy guitar lick that morphs into a spare electro-infused beat". Tisdale soothingly harmonises over the groovy guitar riff and alternative pop beat that drives the chorus. Lyrically, the track explores the deep thoughts of anxiety and mental health.

== Live performances ==
Tisdale first performed the song live at the Macy's Thanksgiving Day Parade on November 16, 2018. It was also performed on Holton's Heroes Benefit Concert on November 22, 2018. On May 2, 2019, Tisdale performed the song on The Late Late Show with James Corden to promote the album.

== Track listing ==
Digital download

1. "Voices in My Head" – 3:19

== Credits and personnel ==
- Vocals – Ashley Tisdale
- Songwriting – Ashley Tisdale, John Feldmann, Whitney Phillips
- Production – John Feldmann
