= Kiiara =

American singer-songwriter (born 1995)

- Born: Kiara Saulters; May 24, 1995 (age 31); Wilmington, Illinois, U.S.
- Genres: Pop; alternative R&B; experimental pop; electropop
- Occupations: Singer; songwriter
- Instrument: Vocals
- Years active: 2013–present
- Labels: Independent; Atlantic; Warner Canada)

Kiara Saulters (born May 24, 1995), known professionally as Kiiara, is an American singer-songwriter from Wilmington, Illinois. She is currently signed to Atlantic Records. Her 2015 single "Gold" peaked at number 13 on the Billboard Hot 100 chart. She is also known for contributing vocals to Linkin Park's 2017 single "Heavy".

== Early life ==
Kiiara was born on May 24, 1995, in Wilmington, Illinois. She attended Wilmington High School where she played for the school's volleyball team. While recording her breakout EP, she also worked as a hardware store clerk. She started a studio internship to help familiarize herself with the music process and get practice recording.

== Career ==
In 2013, Kiiara independently released an acoustic pop single called "Bring Me Back" under her real name.

In June 2015, after signing a deal to Atlantic Records and changing to her stage name from Kiara Saulters to Kiiara, she released her debut single "Gold". Later that year, "Gold" was chosen as background music of a 15-second Apple Watch commercial titled "Style". The song was her first entry on the Billboard Hot 100, peaking at number 13. Her debut extended play (EP), Low Kii Savage was released on March 22, 2016. The video for "Gold" quickly gained popularity, reaching five million views during mid-May 2016.

On September 15, 2016, Kiiara made her television debut, performing "Gold" on The Tonight Show with Jimmy Fallon. Kiiara was featured on Linkin Park's single, "Heavy", which was released digitally on February 16, 2017 and on radio on February 21. She later performed "Heavy" with Julia Michaels at the Linkin Park and Friends: Celebrate Life in Honor of Chester Bennington concert at the Hollywood Bowl which was held after the death of Linkin Park's vocalist Chester Bennington.

In March 2018, she was featured on the Cheat Codes single "Put Me Back Together".

On June 7, 2019, she released the single "Open My Mouth". Kiiara stated that it would serve as the lead single from her debut studio album, along with another single "Bipolar", released on September 6, 2019. However, both were cut from the final track listing, although the first one featured on a deluxe edition of the record.

On October 9, 2020, she released her debut studio album Lil Kiiwi, which includes her previously released singles "Gold", "Feels", and "Whippin" featuring Felix Snow, as well as new singles "I Still Do", "Never Let You", and "Numb" featuring DeathbyRomy and Pvris. A deluxe edition of her album was later released, which included two songs "Intention" and "Tennessee" taken from her debut extended play, Low Kii Savage, as well as two previous non-album singles, "Messy" and "Open My Mouth".

== Influences ==
Kiiara has cited Eminem, Rihanna, Joyner Lucas, Yelawolf, and Linkin Park as her influences.

== Discography ==
=== Studio albums ===
Title	Details	Certifications
Lil Kiiwi	Released: October 9, 2020; Label: Atlantic; Formats: Digital download, streaming	MC: Gold; RIAA: Gold

=== Extended plays ===
Title	Details	Peak chart positions		
Title	Details	US	US Heat.	AUS
Low Kii Savage	Released: March 22, 2016; Label: Atlantic; Formats: Digital download, vinyl	41	13	46

=== Singles ===
==== As lead artist ====
List of singles, with selected chart positions, showing year released and album name
Title	Year	Peak chart positions										Certifications	Album
Title	Year	US	AUS	BEL (FL)	CAN	DEN	ITA	NLD	NZ	SWE	UK	Certifications	Album
"Bring Me Back" (as Kiara Saulters)	2013	—	—	—	—	—	—	—	—	—	—		Non-album single
"Gold"	2015	13	5	15	20	12	53	56	22	29	48	RIAA: 3× Platinum; ARIA: 2× Platinum; BEA: Platinum; BPI: Platinum; IFPI DEN: Gold; FIMI: Platinum; MC: 4× Platinum; RMNZ: Platinum	Low Kii Savage and Lil Kiiwi
"Feels"	2016	—	—	—	—	—	—	—	—	—	—	RIAA: Gold; MC: Gold	Low Kii Savage and Lil Kiiwi
"Hang Up tha Phone"	2016	—	—	—	—	—	—	—	—	—	—		Low Kii Savage
"Dopemang" (featuring Ashley All Day)	2016	—	—	—	—	—	—	—	—	—	—		Non-album single
"Whippin" (featuring Felix Snow)	2017	—	—	— (Note: "Whippin" did not enter the Ultratop 50, but peaked at number 46 on the Flemish Ultratip chart.)	94	—	—	113	— (Note: "Whippin" did not enter the NZ Top 40 Singles Chart, but peaked at number six on the NZ Heatseekers Singles Chart.)	—	—	MC: Gold	Lil Kiiwi
"Wishlist"	2017	—	—	—	—	—	—	—	—	—	—		Non-album single
"Messy"	2018	—	—	—	—	—	—	—	—	—	—		Lil Kiiwi
"Gloe"	2018	—	—	—	—	—	—	—	—	—	—		Non-album single
"Diamonds" (with Jauz)	2018	—	—	—	—	—	—	—	—	—	—		The Wise and the Wicked
"1%"	2018	—	—	—	—	—	—	—	—	—	—		Non-album singles
"L*** Is a Bad Word"	2018	—	—	—	—	—	—	—	—	—	—		Non-album singles
"I Don't Wanna Be Friends"	2018	—	—	—	—	—	—	—	—	—	—		Non-album singles
"How Can You Love Me"	2018	—	—	—	—	—	—	—	—	—	—		Non-album singles
"Open My Mouth"	2019	—	—	—	—	—	—	—	—	—	—		Lil Kiiwi
"Bipolar"	2019	—	—	—	—	—	—	—	—	—	—		Non-album single
"I Still Do"	2020	—	—	—	—	—	—	—	—	—	—		Lil Kiiwi
"Never Let You"	2020	—	—	—	—	—	—	—	—	—	—		Lil Kiiwi
"Numb" (featuring DeathbyRomy and Pvris)	2020	—	—	—	—	—	—	—	—	—	—		Lil Kiiwi
"So Sick" (featuring Blackbear)	2020	—	—	—	—	—	—	—	—	—	—		Lil Kiiwi
"Happy Hour" (with Felix Cartal)	2021	—	—	—	—	—	—	—	—	—	—		Expensive Sounds for Nice People
"Used to Be" (with Steve Aoki featuring Wiz Khalifa)	2021	—	—	—	—	—	—	—	— (Note: "Used to Be" did not enter the NZ Top 40 Singles Chart, but peaked at number 18 on the NZ Hot Singles Chart.)	—	—		Non-album singles
"King" (with Rosa Linn)	2021	—	—	—	—	—	—	—	—	—	—		Non-album singles
"Closer"	2022	—	—	—	—	—	—	—	—	—	—		Non-album singles
"Miss Me"	2022	—	—	—	—	—	—	—	—	—	—		Non-album singles
"Microdose"	2022	—	—	—	—	—	—	—	—	—	—		Non-album singles
"Hangover"	2023	—	—	—	—	—	—	—	—	—	—		Non-album singles
"Cum in Peace"	2023	—	—	—	—	—	—	—	—	—	—		Non-album singles
"Speed"	2023	—	—	—	—	—	—	—	—	—	—		Non-album singles
"Whoops"	2023	—	—	—	—	—	—	—	—	—	—		Non-album singles
"This Time" (with Burko and The Archer)	2025	—	—	—	—	—	—	—	—	—	—		Non-album singles
"Love & Drugs" (with Teamwork. and American Authors)	2025	—	—	—	—	—	—	—	—	—	—		Non-album singles
"—" denotes a recording that did not chart or was not released in that territory.

==== As featured artist ====
List of singles, with selected chart positions, showing year released and album name
Title	Year	Peak chart positions										Certifications	Album
Title	Year	US	AUS	AUT	BEL (FL)	BEL (WA)	CAN	IRE	ITA	SWI	UK	Certifications	Album
"Heavy" (Linkin Park featuring Kiiara)	2017	45	33	9	— (Note: "Heavy" did not enter the Ultratop 50, but peaked at number 4 on the Flemish Ultratip chart.)	— (Note: "Heavy" did not enter the Ultratop 50 nor the bubbling under Ultratip chart, but was registered in the Ultratip charts as an extra tip.)	46	88	78	8	43	RIAA: 2× Platinum; ARIA: Gold; BPI: Silver; BVMI: Gold; FIMI: Gold; IFPI SWI: Gold	One More Light
"Complicated" (Dimitri Vegas & Like Mike and David Guetta featuring Kiiara)	2017	—	—	51	4	6	—	—	—	37	—	BEA: Platinum	Non-album singles
"Cross My Mind Pt. 2" (A R I Z O N A featuring Kiiara)	2017	—	—	—	—	—	—	—	—	—	—		Non-album singles
"Darkside" (Ty Dolla $ign & Future featuring Kiiara)	2017	—	—	—	—	—	—	—	—	—	—		Bright: The Album
"Put Me Back Together" (Cheat Codes featuring Kiiara)	2018	—	—	—	—	—	—	—	—	—	—		Non-album singles
"Be Somebody" (Steve Aoki and Nicky Romero featuring Kiiara)	2018	—	—	—	—	—	—	—	—	—	—		Non-album singles
"You're Not Alone" (Don Diablo featuring Kiiara)	2019	—	—	—	—	—	—	—	—	—	—		Non-album singles
"Obsessed" (Ashley All Day featuring Kiiara)	2019	—	—	—	—	—	—	—	—	—	—		Non-album singles
"Lonely Baby" (Hyphen Hyphen featuring Kiiara)	2019	—	—	—	—	— (Note: "Lonely Baby" did not enter the Ultratop 50, but peaked at number 43 on the Walloon Ultratip chart.)	—	—	—	—	—		Non-album singles
"Back to You" (Ekali featuring Kiiara)	2019	—	—	—	—	—	—	—	—	—	—		A World Away
"Never Felt Like This" (Devault featuring Kiiara)	2021	—	—	—	—	—	—	—	—	—	—		Non-album single
"—" denotes a recording that did not chart or was not released in that territory.

=== Guest appearances ===
List of non-single guest appearances, with other performing artists, showing year released and album name
Title	Year	Other artist(s)	Album
"Chit Chat"	2018	Alma	Heavy Rules Mixtape
"Makin Money"	2018	Lil Aaron	Rock$tar Famou$
"In the Stars"	2019	One OK Rock	Eye of the Storm
"Ain't About You"	2021	Wonho	Love Synonym Pt.2: Right for Us
