= Terror Jr =

American pop duo

- Genres: Pop
- Years active: 2016–present
- Labels: Grape Music/Opposition; Atlantic; Effess
- Members: David "Campa" Benjamin Singer-Vine; Lisa Vitale
- Past members: Felix Snow

Terror Jr is an American pop duo formed in 2016 founded by former the Cataracs band member David "Campa" Benjamin Singer-Vine, Lisa Vitale, and Felix Snow, who left the group in late 2017. Their single "Come First" peaked at number 10 on the Billboard Spotify Velocity chart, number 6 on the Billboard Hot Dance/Electronic songs chart, number 54 in the Czech Republic, and number 59 in Slovakia.

== Background ==
Members Felix Snow and David "Campa" Benjamin Singer-Vine met through Twitter in 2014 and first worked together on a project called Momma, releasing a 4 track EP. They reconnected the following year working with singer Kiiara on her single "Gold". In 2016, they started Terror Jr as a "social experiment", with Singer-Vine adding "It's a puzzle, and we're gonna give out pieces with each song." The group released their debut extended play Bop City on October 21, 2016.

In November 2016, Kylie Jenner was rumored to be the lead singer of Terror Jr. Jenner denied being a part of the group in a Snapchat post on November 9, 2016. Jenner (as 'King Kylie') would later feature on their 2025 single "Fourth Strike".

Terror Jr released the song "Heartbreaks" through their YouTube channel on November 24, 2016. On February 14, 2017, the group released a remix package of "Come First".

In May 2017, the group released "Caramel" and "Death Wish" as the first two songs from Bop City 2: TerroRising, released on June 16, 2017.

On September 8, 2017, Terror Jr released a new single "Holding Your Tongue". The single was quickly followed by the announcement of the group's third LP, Bop City 3: The Girl Who Cried Purple, released September 29, 2017. They released the song "Sad Sad Girl" in December 2017.

In 2018, they released the singles "Heaven Wasn't Made For Me" and "A-OK (Everything's Perfect)".

Their debut album Unfortunately, Terror Jr was released on January 25, 2019. That same year, the duo departed Atlantic Records. On October 4, they released the single "9 2 5". On November 8, 2019, the group released the EP Come Outside and Break Your Heart, their first release under their own label, Grape Music. On November 13, 2020, they released the EP Bloody Waters. Three days later, they announced on their social media that their upcoming album, Rancho Catastrophe, would be released later that week on November 20.

== Discography ==
=== Albums ===
Title	Album details
Unfortunately, Terror Jr	Released: January 25, 2019; Label: Atlantic, Effess; Format: Digital download, streaming
Rancho Catastrophe	Released: November 20, 2020; Label: Grape Music / Opposition; Format: Digital download, streaming
Road to Grapeness	Released: November 19, 2021; Label: Grape Music / Opposition; Format: Digital download, streaming
The Terror Jr Album	Released: November 7, 2025; Label: Grape Music / Opposition; Format: Digital download, streaming

=== Extended plays ===
Title	EP details
Bop City	Released: October 21, 2016; Label: Atlantic, Effess; Format: Digital download
Bop City 2: TerroRising	Released: June 16, 2017; Label: Atlantic, Effess; Format: Digital download
Bop 3: The Girl Who Cried Purple	Released: September 29, 2017; Label: Atlantic, Effess; Format: Digital download
Come Outside and Break Your Heart	Released: November 8, 2019; Label: Grape Music; Format: Digital download, streaming
Bloody Waters	Released: November 13, 2020; Label: Grape Music; Format: Digital download, streaming

=== Singles ===
Title	Year	Peak chart positions					Certifications	Album
Title	Year	US Dance	CZE	NZ Hot	SLK	SWE Heat.	Certifications	Album
"3 Strikes"	2016	—	—	—	—	—	RMNZ: Gold	Bop City
"Sugar"	2016	—	—	—	—	—		Bop City
"Say So"	2016	45	—	—	—	—		Bop City
"Come First"	2016	—	54	—	59	1		Bop City
"Caramel"	2017	—	—	—	—	—		Bop City 2: TerroRising
"Death Wish"	2017	—	—	—	—	—		Bop City 2: TerroRising
"Appreciation"	2017	—	—	—	—	—		Bop City 2: TerroRising
"Holding Your Tongue"	2017	—	—	—	—	—		Bop 3: The Girl Who Cried Purple
"Useless"	2017	—	—	—	—	—		Bop 3: The Girl Who Cried Purple
"Heaven Wasn't Made for Me"	2018	—	—	—	—	—		Unfortunately, Terror Jr
"A-OK (Everything's Perfect)"	2018	—	—	—	—	—		Unfortunately, Terror Jr
"Pretty"	2018	—	—	—	—	—		Unfortunately, Terror Jr
"Terrified"	2018	—	—	—	—	—		Unfortunately, Terror Jr
"9 2 5"	2019	—	—	—	—	—		Come Outside and Break Your Heart
"Crowded Rooms"	2019	—	—	—	—	—		Come Outside and Break Your Heart
"Enemies"	2019	—	—	—	—	—		Come Outside and Break Your Heart
"Straight from the Bottle"	2019	—	—	—	—	—		Come Outside and Break Your Heart
"Mona Lisa"	2020	—	—	—	—	—		Rancho Catastrophe
"Fun"	2020	—	—	—	—	—		Rancho Catastrophe
"Dinner Plate"	2020	—	—	—	—	—		Rancho Catastrophe
"Would It Make You Feel Better?"	2020	—	—	—	—	—		Rancho Catastrophe
"Running from the Sun"	2020	—	—	—	—	—		Rancho Catastrophe
"Bloody Waters"	2020	—	—	—	—	—		Rancho Catastrophe
"Fourth Strike" (with King Kylie)	2025	—	—	27	—	—		The Terror Jr Album
