= Ashley Tisdale =

American actress and singer (born 1985)

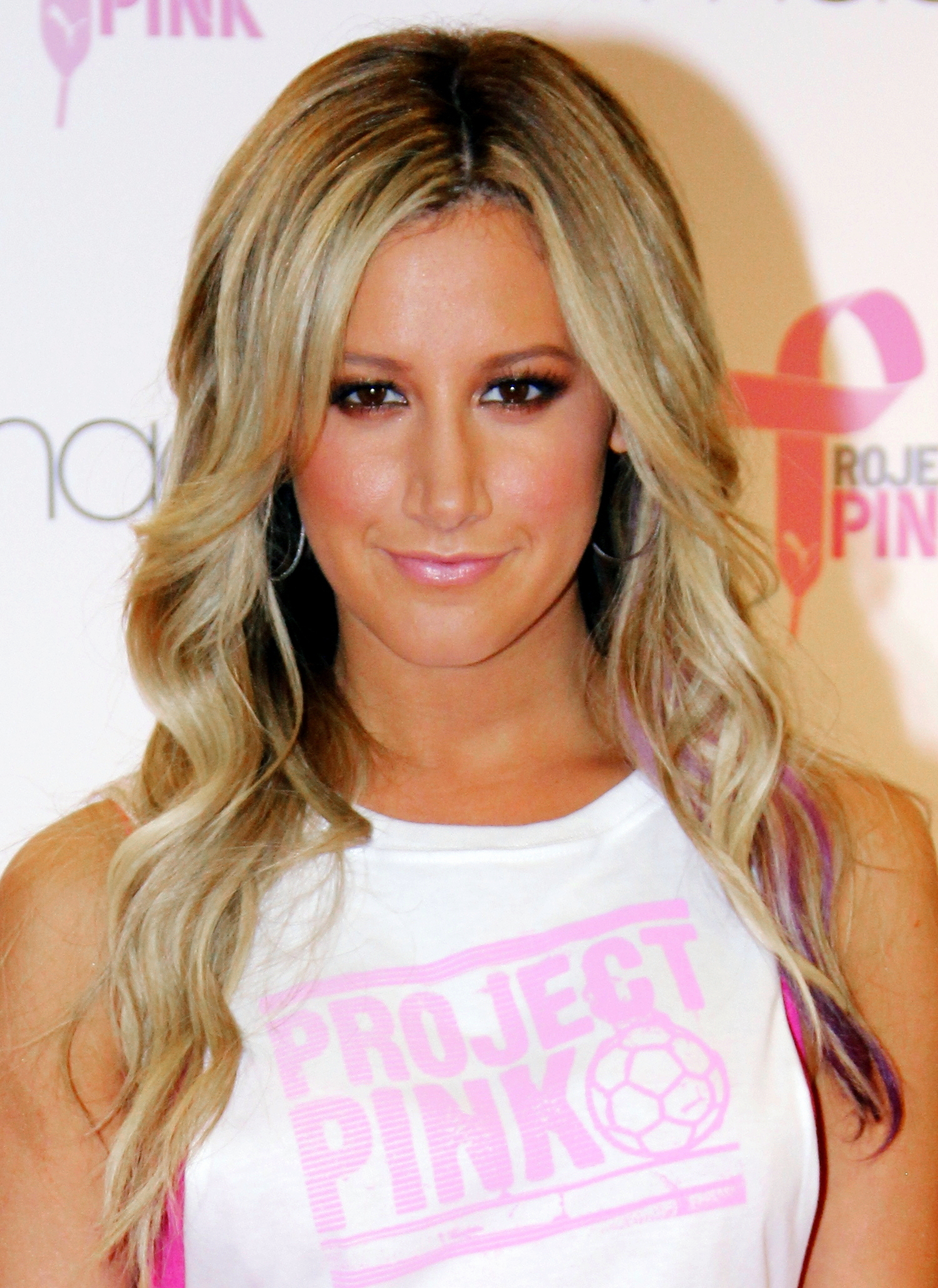
- Tisdale in 2012
- Born: Ashley Michelle Tisdale; July 2, 1985 (age 41); Monmouth County, New Jersey, U.S.
- Other name: Ashley French
- Occupations: Actress; singer
- Years active: 1988–present
- Spouse: Christopher French (m. 2014)
- Children: 2
- Relatives: Jennifer Tisdale (sister)
- Musical career
- Genre: Pop
- Instrument: Vocals
- Labels: Warner Bros.; Big Noise

Ashley Michelle Tisdale-French (born July 2, 1985) is an American actress and singer. During her childhood, she was featured in over 100 advertisements and had minor roles on-screen and in theatre. She achieved mainstream success as Maddie Fitzpatrick in the Disney Channel teen sitcom The Suite Life of Zack & Cody (2005–2008). This success was heightened when she starred as Sharpay Evans in the High School Musical film series (2006–2011). The success of the films led to Tisdale's signing with Warner Bros. Records and subsequently releasing her debut studio album, Headstrong (2007), which was a commercial success, earning a gold certification from the Recording Industry Association of America (RIAA). Tisdale also provides the voice of Candace Flynn in the Disney Channel animated series Phineas and Ferb (2007–2015; 2025–present).

Tisdale's second studio album, Guilty Pleasure (2009), was released to less commercial success than its predecessor. Tisdale would part ways with Warner Bros. Records following the release of the album. During this time, she began appearing in more films and returned to television with shows such as Hellcats (2010). Tisdale's production company Blondie Girl Productions, first formed in 2008, signed a multi-year production deal with Relativity Media in 2010; Tisdale would produce shows such as Miss Advised (2012) as part of the deal. Tisdale starred in the High School Musical spin-off film Sharpay's Fabulous Adventure (2011), also releasing a soundtrack to promote the film.

In 2013, Tisdale announced work on her third studio album, releasing the promotional single "You're Always Here", and starred in the horror comedy film Scary Movie 5. She has continued to appear in television roles, joining the main cast of Clipped (2015). She also served as executive producer of the ABC Family television series Young & Hungry (2014–2018). In 2018, Tisdale returned to music with the release of the singles "Voices in My Head" and "Love Me & Let Me Go". Her third studio album and first in a decade, Symptoms, was released in 2019. Recently, Tisdale starred as Jenny Kenney in the CBS sitcom Carol's Second Act (2019–2020), served as a panelist on the reality competition show The Masked Dancer (2020–2021), and led the interactive video game The Dark Pictures Anthology: House of Ashes (2021).

== Early life ==
Ashley Michelle Tisdale was born on July 2, 1985, in Monmouth County, New Jersey, to Lisa Morris and contractor Michael Tisdale. Her father is Christian and her mother is Jewish; she was raised with "a little bit of both" religions. Tisdale's elder sister Jennifer is an actress and producer. She is also related to businessman Ron Popeil through her maternal grandfather Arnold Morris who was best known for being a pitchman for the Ginsu knife. Despite working in film and television at a young age, Tisdale worked retail jobs and attended public school, stating "I was always in regular school and I worked in clothing stores growing up. I didn't 'make it' until I was 18, so I had already graduated public school. I definitely feel like I had the best of both worlds."

== Career ==
=== 1985–2004: Childhood and career beginnings ===
At the age of three, Tisdale met her manager, Bill Perlman, at a talent search held at Monmouth Mall in Eatontown, New Jersey. He sent her to various auditions for commercials, and she was placed in more than one hundred national network TV advertisements as a child. She began her theatrical career by appearing in Gypsy: A Musical Fable and The Sound of Music at Monmouth County's Jewish Community Center. Tisdale was eight years old when she was cast to play the part of Cosette in the musical Les Misérables, and only recalled taking a single singing lesson before landing the role. In 2007, Tisdale told Newsday, "When I was little, I saw the play Les Misérables on Broadway. I thought it was the most amazing thing I have ever seen, so I went to my manager and told him I wanted to be in it". Tisdale toured for two years with Les Misérables before landing a role in a touring production of Annie in Korea.

When Tisdale was twelve, she sang for then-President Bill Clinton during an event at the White House as part of a troupe. Hoping to expand her career, Tisdale and her family moved to Los Angeles, California. She landed her first role in 1997, guest starring on episodes of both Smart Guy and 7th Heaven. During this time, she also began doing modeling work for Ford Models. The following year, Tisdale appeared as a voice actor in both An All Dogs Christmas Carol (1998) and A Bug's Life (1998). She guest starred in an episode of Boston Public in 2000, earning a 2000 Young Artist Award nomination for "Best Guest Performance in a TV Drama". Tisdale continued to make guest appearances on television shows and appear in minor film roles throughout the following years, with roles in films such as the cult film Donnie Darko (2001) and The Mayor of Oyster Bay (2002).

=== 2005–2009: Breakthrough with films and music ===
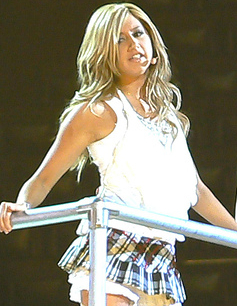
Tisdale performing during High School Musical: The Concert in 2006

Tisdale joined the main cast of the Disney Channel series The Suite Life of Zack & Cody in 2005, and would continue to star in the series until its conclusion in 2008. The show proved to be a hit for the network, and earned Tisdale a Nickelodeon UK Kids' Choice Awards. Tisdale had her breakout role as Sharpay Evans in the Disney Channel film High School Musical (2006). The film was the network's most successful film of 2006, receiving 7.7 million viewers upon its premiere. The soundtrack for the film, featuring numerous contributions from Tisdale, went on to sell over three million copies in the United States alone. The song "What I've Been Looking For" (2006), a duet with Lucas Grabeel, became her first top 40 hit on the Billboard Hot 100, and was certified gold by the Recording Industry Association of America (RIAA). Tisdale, along with the rest of the cast, embarked on the High School Musical: The Concert (2006–2007) tour to promote the film. She met dancer Jared Murillo while working on High School Musical, and the two later dated for two years; they split up in 2009. During this time, Tisdale began appearing on soundtracks for the Disney Channel, and released a cover of "Kiss the Girl" (2006) to promote The Little Mermaid.

With the success of High School Musical, Tisdale was offered a recording contract from Warner Bros. Records; she began working on her debut studio album in 2006. "Be Good to Me" (2006) was released as the album's lead single, with "He Said She Said" (2007) being released shortly afterwards as the second single. Tisdale's debut album, Headstrong (2007), was released in February; the album featured elements of dance-pop and hip-hop music. The album sold 64,000 copies in its first week of release in the United States, debuting at number five on the Billboard 200. The project was a commercial success, selling over 500,000 copies in the country. "He Said She Said" was later re-released as the album's second single to promote the album, and went on to earn a gold certification from the RIAA. The album's final two singles were released exclusively in select European territories. Tisdale embarked on her Headstrong Tour Across America to promote the album. She also co-executive produced a documentary, There's Something About Ashley (2007), documenting the recording of the album and the production of her music videos.

Tisdale reprised her role as Sharpay Evans in High School Musical 2 (2007). The film was viewed by seventeen million people during its premiere, making it the most-watched movie on cable television. She received positive reviews for her performance in the film, which earned two Primetime Emmy Awards nominations. The film's soundtrack topped the Billboard 200, selling 615,000 copies in its first week of release. Tisdale was later cast in the animated Disney Channel series Phineas and Ferb as the voice of Candace Flynn. The series debuted to ten million viewers and became the most-watched animated series among kids and tweens in 2010. Phineas and Ferb has also received acclaim by critics and has won three Primetime Emmy Awards. Tisdale remained on the series until its conclusion in 2015, appearing in various television films in the role as well.

In 2008, Tisdale formed her own production company, Blondie Girl Productions. The television film Picture This (2008) marked Tisdale's debut as an executive producer and as an actress in a leading role; she played Mandy Gilbert, an unpopular and bullied teenager. The film premiered on ABC Family in 2008 to 4.3 million viewers. Tisdale again appeared as Sharpay Evans in High School Musical 3: Senior Year, which was released in October 2008. It earned $42 million in its domestic opening weekend, and grossed a total of $255 million worldwide. Her performance in the film earned her critical acclaim, earning an MTV Movie Award for "Breakthrough Performance Female" in 2009. Owen Gleiberman of Entertainment Weekly labeled her one of film's breakout stars, and Mark Kermode said Tisdale was 2008's "best supporting actress".

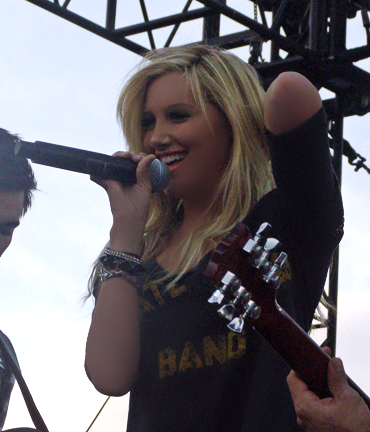
Tisdale performing at the opening of the first Microsoft Store in Scottsdale, Arizona, in October 2009

Tisdale began working on her second studio album in 2008, taking more creative control over the record than with her last. The album served as a musical departure from her prior record, with Tisdale hoping to attain a more "rock-oriented" and "edgier" sound. The project was preceded by the release of "It's Alright, It's OK" (2009), which went on to have some success in countries such as Austria and Germany. Her second studio album, Guilty Pleasure (2009), was released in select territories on June 11, 2009; it would not receive a release in the United States until July 28. The album sold an estimated 25,000 copies in its first week of release, debuting at number twelve on the Billboard 200. The album's second and final single, "Crank It Up" (2009), was released in select European territories. Tisdale parted ways with the label following the release of the record. During this time, Tisdale began dating director Scott Speer, who had directed her previous music videos; the couple would break up in 2011.

Tisdale also starred in the film Aliens in the Attic (2009) as teenager Bethany Pearson. Although she is credited as one of the main characters, The New York Times said Tisdale "spends much of the film off-screen". The film was a minor success in box offices, grossing $60 million worldwide.

=== 2010–2015: Television roles and expansion ===
Tisdale announced her return to television in 2010, starring as head-cheerleader Savannah Monroe in The CW drama Hellcats. Tisdale was reported to be the highest paid cast member on the series, earning $30,000 per episode. The show ran for one season, and was cancelled by the network in 2011. Blondie Girl Productions signed a production deal in 2010 to create, develop, and produce both films and television shows. During this time, Tisdale did voice work for the adult animated series Family Guy and The Cleveland Show; she appeared in two episodes of the former. In 2010, Disney Channel announced its intention to produce a High School Musical spin-off focusing on the life of Sharpay Evans in New York after she concluded high school. Tisdale was confirmed to return as Evans for the spin-off and serve as the executive producer of the project. Sharpay's Fabulous Adventure premiered on Disney Channel to five million viewers in August 2011.

In 2012, she made a guest appearance in an episode of Raising Hope and had a starring role in a CBS pilot produced by Louis C.K., which was not picked up by the channel. Tisdale also portrayed a desirable and high-priced escort in a two-episode arc in the fifth season of FX's Sons of Anarchy. She served as the executive producer of the reality-television series Miss Advised in 2012. In 2013, E! aired a television special produced by Tisdale named Inner Circle that focused on her friendship with actress Vanessa Hudgens. The next year, Tisdale teamed again with Disney Channel on the film Cloud 9, on which she worked as an executive producer. ABC Family's comedy series Young & Hungry is also produced by Tisdale; it stars Emily Osment and premiered in June 2014.

In June 2012, The Weinstein Company announced that Tisdale had been given the leading role in Dimension Films' Scary Movie 5. She portrayed Jody, a dancer in her late-20s. The film was released in April 2013, and grossed $15 million on its first weekend, making it the lowest-grossing weekend for a Scary Movie film; it was also panned by critics. Tisdale had a recurring role in ABC's sitcom Super Fun Night as Jazmine, the sister of Rebel Wilson's character, and guest starred on CBS's The Crazy Ones in 2013. That same year, Tisdale was cast to voice the title character of Hub Network's animated series Sabrina: Secrets of a Teenage Witch. For her performance as Sabrina, Tisdale was nominated for "Outstanding Performer in an Animated Program" in the 41st Daytime Emmy Awards.

Tisdale told MTV in 2013 that she had begun working on her third studio album. She said she was inspired to make music again and that she hoped to "surprise people a little bit, something different from what I've done before". Tisdale announced to MTV that she opted to pursue a dance-pop sound on the album, which was expected to be released in 2014. In December 2013, Tisdale teased on her Twitter account about a "special project" related to music. She confirmed that the project was a single titled "You're Always Here", which was written about her late grandfather. The song was eventually released independently to digital stores that same month.

In December 2014, The Hollywood Reporter announced Tisdale was cast as a prostitute in the comedy Amateur Night alongside Jason Biggs. In 2014, Tisdale auditioned for TBS's workplace comedy series Clipped, on which she was eventually cast in a main role as Danni. The series ran from June to August 2015, and was canceled in October after one season.

=== 2016–present: Return to music ===
In 2016, Tisdale resumed work on her third studio album with her husband. The couple began posting cover versions of hit songs on Tisdale's YouTube channel, including a rendition of Elle King's "Ex's & Oh's" featuring Vanessa Hudgens. Tisdale released her third studio album and first in a decade, Symptoms, in May 2019 with independent label Big Noise Music Group. In June 2019, Tisdale began starring in CBS sitcom Carol's Second Act across from Patricia Heaton. In April 2019, Tisdale confirmed she was working on her fourth studio album to follow up Symptoms. She teased a new song with a snippet on May 29, 2019. On May 4, 2020, she teased a new track titled "Lemons" which is speculated to be the lead single from the album.

In October 2020, it was announced that Tisdale would serve as a panelist on the Masked Singer spinoff, The Masked Dancer, along with Ken Jeong, Paula Abdul, and Brian Austin Green. In September 2021, Tisdale was cast in the game The Dark Pictures Anthology: House of Ashes, which was her debut as a video game character and was released that same year.

== Other ventures ==
=== Activism and philanthropy ===
Tisdale has supported various charitable organizations and causes during her career. She collaborated with the Make a Wish Foundation in 2008 by visiting sick children in hospitals and helping to raise funds for the organization. Tisdale is also a supporter of Habitat for Humanity, a charity devoted to building homes for people in need. She was scheduled to perform on Idol Gives Back 2008, along with her High School Musical co-star Vanessa Hudgens. However, they were unable to appear due to their High School Musical 3: Senior Year filming schedule; they recorded a video from the film's set to support the cause instead. She contributed to the A Very Special Christmas 7 album with her rendition of Wham!'s "Last Christmas"; proceeds from sales benefited the Special Olympics.

Tisdale was a phone operator during Hope for Haiti Now: A Global Benefit for Earthquake Relief, a charity telethon held in January 2010 to raise funds for seven non-profit organizations that carried out relief work in Haiti following the 2010 Haiti earthquake. Tisdale volunteered for the "Get on the Bus" charity campaign in 2011, which was hosted by the television series Extreme Makeover: Home Edition. She helped to build a house for a family and later performed some of her songs to raise funds. In 2012, she became the face of Project Pink, a campaign launched by Puma SE to raise money for the research of breast cancer treatments. As part of the campaign, she visited Los Angeles' BEST After School Enrichment Program at Pacoima Charter School in California and presented each child that attended with shoes, clothes, and gift cards. In 2013, Tisdale recorded her song titled "You're Always Here" and later released it to digital stores as a charity single. During an interview with On Air with Ryan Seacrest, she confirmed that 30 percent of the proceeds of the song would go to St. Jude Children's Research Hospital.

=== Business ===
In 2014, Tisdale promoted the U.S. launch of Lindt HELLO chocolates by producing an episode of the online series It Started with HELLO. In Autumn of 2014, Tisdale became the creative director of Signorelli, and launched a clothing line with the company in 2016. She will also be overseeing the creation of their spring 2017 sportswear line. Tisdale launched her Illuminate makeup line through BH Cosmetics in 2016.

== Artistry ==
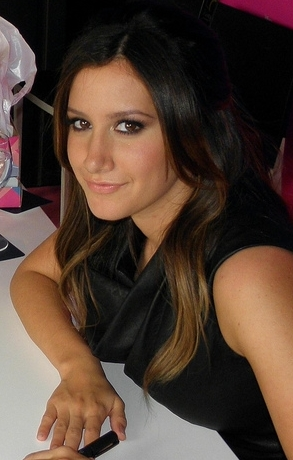
Tisdale during the signing event for Sharpay's Fabulous Adventure in Madrid, Spain, in May 2011

Tisdale has said that she brings something different with every character she portrays in order to make them her own. After the completion of the High School Musical series in 2008, Tisdale was at first reluctant on accepting older roles because she felt "you can never go backward". She eventually began to accept more mature roles in 2012. Her first adult roles were Emma Jean, a high-priced escort in the drama series Sons of Anarchy (2012), and Jody Sanders, a mother of three children in the feature film Scary Movie 5 (2013). Tisdale commented after Scary Movie 5 that the role had taken her out of her comfort zone, and that she planned to continue to challenge herself in the future. While discussing her portrayal of Logan Rawlings, a lesbian, on Young & Hungry (2014), she said she likes "to play different characters and push the envelope out of [her] own comfort level", but confessed she had been nervous about the idea of playing a lesbian. Her main acting influences are Jake Gyllenhaal, Johnny Depp, Robin Williams and Rebel Wilson. Tisdale claims that she would like to emulate Shia LaBeouf's career because "he did it so well" and that she is inspired by Wilson's ability to work simultaneously as a writer, producer and actress in ABC's Super Fun Night.

Tisdale's music, which is predominantly considered pop, has included ballads, dance-pop, hip hop, and rock influences. Boys, heartbreak, and relationship breakups are common themes in Tisdale's songs. She defined her music career as a way to connect herself with the fans and to inspire them. She claimed that, while Headstrong (2007) allowed her to "learn [herself] as an artist", with her second album, Guilty Pleasure (2009), she knew exactly what she wanted to do as an artist. Tisdale has named many influences on her musical career, including Christina Aguilera, Michael Jackson, Lady Gaga, Pat Benatar, Pink, Katy Perry, Kelly Clarkson, Led Zeppelin, and AC/DC. Tisdale said that "almost anything" inspires her, but she is mainly inspired by female pop singers. She often co-writes the songs she records; for her debut album Headstrong, she had writing credits in four songs, while she co-wrote five tracks for her album Guilty Pleasure. The songs in which she has songwriting credits are often personal. In 2009, while discussing the songs she co-wrote for her second studio album, Tisdale said that "a lot of the songs on the album [were] about survival and staying strong" and that she wanted those songs to be "a statement and a reflection of what [she went] through over the past year and how [she has] grown up." She named the song "What If" as the most personal song she co-wrote for Guilty Pleasure. She discussed the death of her grandfather in the song "You're Always Here", which she wrote with her husband, Christopher French.

== Media image ==
Tisdale is ranked on Maxim's Hot 100 list of sexiest women and hottest celebrities in the 2008 list (at number 10), in 2013 (at number seven), and in 2014 (at number 33). She posed completely nude for the May 2011 issue of Allure and was quoted in the accompanying article as saying that "being in this shoot was me saying, 'I'm not just the young girl everybody thinks I am. I'm actually a woman.'" She appeared on the cover of Maxim's May 2013 issue. Tisdale has become a popular and active figure in social media; she has attained more than 13 million followers on Twitter and she has more than 19 million Likes on Facebook both as of May 2019. Her popularity on social media led her to appear for three weeks on Billboard's Social 50 chart, peaking at number 18, and to win the award for "Social Media Superstar" at the Young Hollywood Awards in 2014. She was also named the 45th most influential woman on Twitter by The Huffington Post in 2015.

Tisdale's acting performances have been met with praise by critics and film producers. She was named a "scene stealer" in High School Musical 2 (2007) by Laura Fries of Variety. Jennifer Frey of The Washington Post says that Tisdale dominated the film despite not being the lead character, while Andy Webster of The New York Times praised her acting style, mainly because of her "elastic face [that] lends itself to numerous reaction shots". John Schultz, who directed the film Aliens in the Attic (2009) in which Tisdale starred, says she is a "big comedic actress" and has a "gift" for comedy. The creator of the television series Hellcats (2010), Kevin Murphy, praised her acting skills and said Tisdale "can hold multiple colors in the same palette." Her performance in Scary Movie 5 (2013), however, received negative reviews. Frank Scheck of The Hollywood Reporter panned the film as whole and said Tisdale was not funny enough, and Rafer Guzman of Newsday added she did not have "comic timing" in the film.

Tisdale's music has received mixed reactions by critics. Her debut album Headstrong was compared to the first works of Britney Spears and Christina Aguilera by Billboard. Heather Phares of AllMusic defined Tisdale's voice as "pleasant enough" but not "distinctive" while reviewing her debut album Headstrong and added she had "more character singing" as her role in the High School Musical series. Phares later praised Tisdale's voice by saying her "chirpy, slightly saccharine voice is perfect". Her second studio album Guilty Pleasure, released in 2009, achieved a 48% rating on Metacritic, which indicates "mixed or average reviews". Keri Masson of Billboard stated that Tisdale "can deliver the radio-ready goods" with her 2009 album Guilty Pleasure, but criticized the album as a whole; he believed the album "doesn't give the singer room to comfortably let loose". Stephen Thomas Erlewine, also of AllMusic, said she is not "convincing" on Guilty Pleasure, but praised the overall quality of the songs on the album. Margaret Wappler of the Los Angeles Times gave the album a negative review; she said the album has "few glimmers of hope" and went on to criticize the producers as "not seem[ing] to have gifted Tisdale with their best work".

== Personal life ==
Tisdale became engaged to singer Christopher French in 2013, having dated for over one year; the couple wed on September 8, 2014, in a small private ceremony held in Santa Barbara, California. They have two daughters, born in March 2021 and September 2024. After marriage, she continued to use Tisdale as her professional name and social media handle, until November 17, 2025, when she announced that she would be using the name French. She explained, "I've been Ashley French for so long at home, but I really never changed [it] publicly because everyone knows me as Ashley Tisdale...I just felt like it was time for people to know me for me."

== Filmography ==
- An All Dogs Christmas Carol (1998)
- A Bug's Life (1998)
- Donnie Darko (2001)
- The Mayor of Oyster Bay (2002)
- Grounded for Life (2001)
- High School Musical (2006)
- Whisper of the Heart (2006)
- High School Musical 2 (2007)
- Bring It On: In It to Win It (2007)
- Picture This (2008)
- High School Musical 3: Senior Year (2008)
- Aliens in the Attic (2009)
- Sharpay's Fabulous Adventure (2011)
- Phineas and Ferb the Movie: Across the 2nd Dimension (2011)
- Scary Movie 5 (2013)
- Saving Santa (2013)
- Birds of Paradise (2014)
- Playing It Cool (2014)
- Amateur Night (2016)
- Charming (2018)
- Phineas and Ferb the Movie: Candace Against the Universe (2020)
- Baby Shark's Big Movie! (2023)

== Discography ==
- Headstrong (2007)
- Guilty Pleasure (2009)
- Symptoms (2019)

== Tours ==
- High School Musical: The Concert (2006)
- Headstrong Tour Across America (2007)

== Awards and nominations ==
Name of the award ceremony, year presented, category, nominee of the award, and the result of the nomination
Award	Year	Category	Work	Result	Ref.
American Music Awards	2006	Best Pop Album	High School Musical (shared with cast)	Nominated	
American Music Awards	2007	Soundtrack Favorite Album	High School Musical 2 (shared with cast)	Won	
Annie Awards	2021	Best Voice Acting – TV/Media	Phineas and Ferb the Movie: Candace Against the Universe	Nominated	
Billboard Music Awards	2006	Soundtrack Album of the Year	High School Musical (shared with cast)	Won	
Billboard Music Awards	2006	Album of the Year	High School Musical (shared with cast)	Nominated	
Daytime Emmy Awards	2014	Outstanding Performer in an Animated Program	Sabrina: Secrets of a Teenage Witch	Nominated	
Los Premios MTV Latinoamérica	2009	Best New International Artist	Guilty Pleasure	Nominated	
Los Premios MTV Latinoamérica	2009	Best Live Performance	It's Alright, It's OK	Nominated	
MTV Movie Awards	2009	Breakthrough Performance Female	High School Musical 3: Senior Year	Won	
Nickelodeon Australian Kids' Choice Awards	2008	Fave International TV Star	The Suite Life of Zack & Cody	Nominated	
Nickelodeon UK Kids' Choice Awards	2007	Best TV Actress	The Suite Life of Zack & Cody	Won	
Premios Oye!	2007	International Breakthrough Artist	Headstrong	Nominated	
Teen Choice Awards	2009	Choice Best Actress: Music/Dance	High School Musical 3: Senior Year	Nominated	
Teen Choice Awards	2009	Summer: Movie Star-Female	Aliens in the Attic	Nominated	
Teen Choice Awards	2009	Choice: Movie Music/Dance	High School Musical 3: Senior Year (shared with cast and crew)	Won	
Teen Choice Awards	2015	Choice TV: Scene Stealer	Young & Hungry	Nominated	
Young Artist Award	2000	Best Performance in a Television Drama Series	Boston Public	Nominated	
Young Hollywood Awards	2014	Social Media Superstar	Herself	Won	
