= Omi (singer) =

Jamaican singer (born 1986)

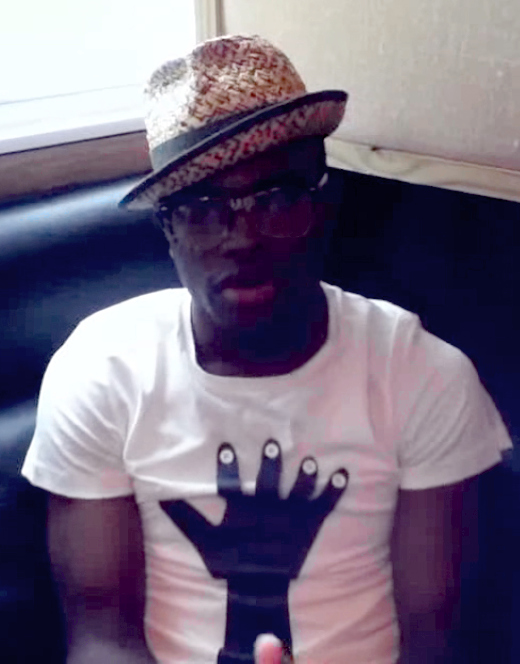
- Omi in 2012

Background information
- Born: Omar Samuel Pasley; 3 September 1986 (age 40); Clarendon, Jamaica
- Genres: Reggae; pop; reggae fusion
- Occupation: Singer
- Years active: 2011–present
- Labels: Ultra; Columbia; Sony; Universal

Omar Samuel Pasley (born 3 September 1986), known professionally as Omi (/ˈoʊmiː/ OH-mee; stylised in all caps as OMI), is a Jamaican singer. He is best known for his 2012 single "Cheerleader", the remixed version of which was a worldwide hit. He was signed to Ultra Music, a part of Sony Music, and released his album Me 4 U in 2015.

== Career ==
=== Beginnings ===
Omar Samuel Pasley was born in the parish of Clarendon. He established in Kingston, after being discovered by the dancehall impresario Clifton Dillon (known as Specialist) and signed to Oufah, an independent Jamaican label. His first recorded single was "Standing On All Threes" released with a music video. OMI had composed his future hit song "Cheerleader" in 2008. He eventually recorded it and performed and released in 2012. It was released in Jamaica along with a low-budget, high-concept video shot in Oregon during OMI's first trip to the United States, becoming a modest hit in Jamaica and also popular in Hawaii and in Dubai. Never releasing an album, OMI had various local hits in Jamaica like "Take It Easy", "Fireworks" (accompanied by a music video) and "Color of My Lips", the latter featuring Busy Signal, a well-known Jamaican dancehall, ska, and reggae artist.

=== 2014–present: Me 4 U ===
In 2014, "Cheerleader" got a second life when Patrick Moxey, the president of Ultra Music, a dance label partly owned by Sony Music heard the song and liked it offering to remix the song and relaunch it as a dance track. In early 2014, Ultra Music commissioned two remixes for the song, one by Ricky Blaze and the other by Felix Jaehn, a 20-year-old German producer. Eventually, Ultra Music opted for the airy tropical house version of "Cheerleader" as remixed by Jaehn. The remix initially became a huge hit in Sweden, eventually certified 5 times platinum. Soon the song spread through other European charts, notably France, Italy and Germany. It topped the charts in several European countries and in Australia. In the United Kingdom, OMI made history on 24 May 2015, when "Cheerleader" topped the UK Singles Chart for a fourth week in a row, marking the longest consecutive period any Jamaican artist has held that position on the chart. In the United States, the song entered the Billboard Hot 100 in May 2015; it later made the top spot of the Hot 100 after 12 weeks in the chart. Claiming the top spot, OMI has achieved recognition worldwide. On 27 August 2015, he released the single "Hula Hoop". He released his debut studio album Me 4 U on 16 October 2015. The album includes the singles "Cheerleader", "Hula Hoop", "Stir It", and "Drop in the Ocean".

== Discography ==
=== Studio album ===
| Title | Details | Peak chart positions | | | | | | | Certifications |
| Title | Details | AUS | CAN | DEN | FRA | SWE | SWI | US | Certifications |
|---|---|---|---|---|---|---|---|---|---|
| Me 4 U | Release date: 16 October 2015; Format: CD, digital download; Label: Ultra, Columbia, Sony | 37 | 18 | 25 | 62 | 9 | 89 | 51 | IFPI DEN: Gold; MC: Platinum; RIAA: Gold |

=== Remix album ===
| Title | Details |
|---|---|
| Me 4 U: The Remixes | Release date: 4 March 2016; Format: CD, digital download; Label: Ultra, Columbia, Sony |

=== Singles ===
==== As lead artist ====
| Title | Year | Peak chart positions | | | | | | | | | | Certifications | Album |
| Title | Year | AUS | CAN | DEN | FRA | GER | NL | SWE | SWI | UK | US | Certifications | Album |
|---|---|---|---|---|---|---|---|---|---|---|---|---|---|
| "Cheerleader" (Felix Jaehn remix) | 2014 | 1 | 1 | 1 | 1 | 1 | 1 | 1 | 1 | 1 | 1 | ARIA: 6× Platinum; BPI: 6× Platinum; BVMI: 4× Platinum; GLF: 7× Platinum; IFPI DEN: 5× Platinum; MC: Diamond; RIAA: 3× Platinum; SNEP: Diamond | Me 4 U |
| "Hula Hoop" | 2015 | 8 | 19 | 8 | 67 | 12 | 20 | 3 | 37 | 75 | — (Note: "Hula Hoop" did not enter the Billboard Hot 100, but peaked at number 16 on the Bubbling Under Hot 100 chart.) | ARIA: Platinum; BPI: Silver; BVMI: Gold; GLF: 2× Platinum; IFPI DEN: Platinum; MC: 2× Platinum | Me 4 U |
| "Drop in the Ocean" (featuring AronChupa) | 2016 | — | — | — | — | — | — | — | — | — | — | | Me 4 U |
| "Masterpiece" (with Felix Jaehn) | 2018 | — | — | — | — | — | — | — | — | — | — | | Formula |
| "As Long as I'm with You" (featuring CMC$) | 2018 | — | — | — | — | — | — | — | — | — | — | | Formula |
| "Better for Ya" | 2019 | — | — | — | — | — | — | — | — | — | — | | Formula |
| "I Want You" | 2019 | — | — | — | — | — | — | — | — | — | — | | Formula |
| "Bring My Baby Back" | 2020 | — | — | — | — | — | — | — | — | — | — | | Formula |
| "Roller Coaster" | 2020 | — | — | — | — | — | — | — | — | — | — | | Formula |
| "Party Like It's Your Birthday" (with Studio Killers) | 2021 | — | — | — | — | — | — | — | — | — | — | | Formula |
| "Hello Hater" (featuring Bori) | 2021 | — | — | — | — | — | — | — | — | — | — | | Formula |
"—" denotes releases that did not chart or were not released in that territory.

==== As featured artist ====
| Title | Year | Peak chart positions | | | | | Certifications | Album |
| Title | Year | UK | IRE | ITA | SCO | SWI | Certifications | Album |
|---|---|---|---|---|---|---|---|---|
| "I Found a Girl" (The Vamps featuring Omi) | 2016 | 30 | 98 | — | 11 | — | BPI: Silver | Wake Up |
| "Seasons" (Shaggy featuring Omi) | 2017 | — | — | — | — | — | | Non-album single |
| "Never" (Marcus & Martinus featuring Omi) | 2017 | — | — | — | — | — | | Moments |
| "Jambo" (Takagi & Ketra featuring Giusy Ferreri and Omi) | 2019 | — | — | 1 | — | 11 | FIMI: 4× Platinum; IFPI SWI: Platinum | Non-album single |
| "I'm on My Way" (Bob Sinclar featuring Omi) | 2020 | — | — | — | — | — | | TBA |
"—" denotes releases that did not chart or were not released in that territory.

== Awards and nominations ==
| Year | Association | Category | Work | Result |
|---|---|---|---|---|
| 2015 | Teen Choice Awards | Choice Summer Song | "Cheerleader" | Nominated |
| 2015 | MOBO Awards | Best Reggae Act | Himself | Nominated |
| 2015 | MTV Video Music Awards | Song of Summer | "Cheerleader" | Nominated |
| 2015 | NRJ Music Award | International Song of the Year | "Cheerleader" | Nominated |
| 2015 | NRJ Music Award | International Breakthrough of the Year | Himself | Nominated |
| 2016 | Billboard Latin Music Awards | Crossover Artist of the Year | Himself | Nominated |
| 2016 | Radio Disney Music Awards | Song of the Year | "Cheerleader" | Nominated |
| 2016 | Radio Disney Music Awards | Best Song That Makes You Smile | "Cheerleader" | Nominated |
| 2016 | Billboard Music Awards | Top New Artist | Himself | Nominated |
| 2016 | Billboard Music Awards | Top Selling Song | "Cheerleader" | Nominated |

== See also ==
- List of artists who reached number one in the United States
