= Symptoms (Ashley Tisdale album) =

Studio album by Ashley Tisdale
- Released: May 3, 2019
- Recorded: 2018–2019
- Genres: Pop; electropop
- Length: 25:07
- Label: Big Noise
- Producer: John Feldmann

Ashley Tisdale chronology
| Guilty Pleasure (2009) | Symptoms (2019) |

Singles from Symptoms
- 1. "Voices in My Head" Released: November 8, 2018; 2. "Love Me & Let Me Go" Released: January 25, 2019

Symptoms is the third studio album by American singer Ashley Tisdale. The album was released through Big Noise Music Group on May 3, 2019. Symptoms follows Tisdale's second studio album, Guilty Pleasure (2009), marking 10 years since her previous full studio release. Tisdale enlisted John Feldmann for the album's production, and collaborated with songwriters including Rachel West, Scot Stewart and Dylan McLean for much of the album's content. A pop and electropop album, Symptoms chronicles Tisdale's silent battle with depression and anxiety, while employing implicit lyrics to give the songs multiple meanings. It is Tisdale’s first album to contain songs with explicit and profane lyrics.

Symptoms received positive reviews from music critics, many of whom called the album "personal", while additionally going on to praise the vulnerability and maturity of the album. Commercially, the album reached number 22 on the US Independent Albums chart with no physical releases, while entering select downloads charts in Europe. It was preceded by the release of two singles: "Voices in My Head", which was released in the fall of 2018, followed by "Love Me & Let Me Go" in January 2019.

== Background ==
Tisdale released her second studio album Guilty Pleasure (2009) via Warner Bros. Records. Described by Tisdale as a "rocker and edgier" album, it generated mixed reviews, with a 54% rating on Metacritic. It debuted at number 12 on the Billboard 200, selling 25,000 copies in the first week; this was significantly lower than the first-week sales for her previous album Headstrong (2007). Promotion for the album ended in the end of that year, following the release of the album's second single "Crank It Up", and, in order to start focusing on her career as an actress and producer, Tisdale decided to end her record deal with Warner Bros. Records.

While promoting the film Scary Movie 5 (2013), in which she starred, Tisdale said in an interview to MTV that she was inspired to create music again and confirmed that since 2012 she has been recording for her third studio album. She hoped to "surprise people a little bit, [with] something different from what [she has] done before". Tisdale became engaged to musician Christopher French in August 2013 and they began working together on music for her third studio album. On December 9, 2013, Tisdale announced the release of a song titled "You're Always Here", releasing as a stand-alone single worldwide on December 16, 2013. The song was written in memory of her grandfather who died in September that same year. It was her first release on music since 2009. However, the song was not promoted to radio and Tisdale eventually paused working on the album because she "wasn't excited about anything [she] was doing" and began adventuring into other ventures such as makeup and clothing lines.

In 2016, Tisdale relaunched her YouTube channel and began posting acoustic cover versions of hit songs, collaborating with other artists such as Vanessa Hudgens, Lea Michele, Echosmith's Sydney Sierota and her husband Chris French. The success of the Paramore's "Still into You" cover featuring Chris French led Tisdale to release it as a promotional single in 2016. Early in 2018, Tisdale released an extended play titled Music Sessions, Vol. 1 containing a few of the covers she originally recorded for her YouTube channel.

== Recording ==
"Right when we wrote that and I recorded it, I started to feel like, 'Oh my gosh, I think I know what this is,'. I was really inspired by what we had written, and so that's kind of how [the album] became about my journey... there's a beginning, and there's the last song of the album that's like me coming out of everything I had been through. You really feel that journey on the album."

— Tisdale explains how writing the song "Symptoms" inspired her to work on a full album.

Although Tisdale had been thinking about releasing a new album since 2013, she was not inspired by the content of the material she had been working on. Later in 2018, she discussed the mental health issues she had gone through with her co-writer Rachel West, and together they wrote a song titled "Symptoms", which led Tisdale to be inspired to resume work on her third studio album.

Tisdale eventually signed with then-newly launched label Big Noise and in July, 2018, announced her third studio album would be titled Symptoms, which was then set to be released sometime in the fall of 2018.

== Concept and lyrical content ==
Tisdale had been silently fighting anxiety and depression for years, so working on the album was therapeutic for her. She wanted each song of the album to discuss a symptom of anxiety and depression in an implicit way so the songs could have other meanings as well. She elaborated by describing the song "Love Me & Let Me Go", which "has the undertones of me talking about my journey with anxiety and depression, but... it could be about a boyfriend, it doesn't have to be about that". When asked by Paper magazine on November 9, 2018, what had inspired her to record the album, Tisdale claimed:

When it comes to something like depression, and someone were to be like, "Hey, who here has depression?" Not a lot of hands go up. It's because there's a stigma about that word. I am a naturalist and I did have depression, but I never took anything for it, I just kind of got my way through it, but I think we have to stop putting these words on us. We have to let go of it and not give it so much power. It's okay to just be okay, and to know that it's okay that you might have depression or you might go through depressive periods. I want people to be feel like they're not alone. "Oh, Ashley goes through this too. I don't feel so alone at home." I didn't want to dwell on it [with the music].

— Ashley Tisdale

== Promotion ==
The album was supported by the lead single, "Voices in My Head", released on November 8, 2018, and later by a second and final single, "Love Me & Let Me Go", released on January 25, 2019. On April 11, 2019, Tisdale tweeted the pre-order link for the album, which also revealed the track list. On May 2, 2019, Tisdale performed on The Late Late Show with James Corden where she sang lead single “Voices In My Head” to promote the album.

== Critical reception ==
Professional ratings
Review scores
| Source | Rating |
|---|---|
| Forbes | (Positive) |
| Medium | 4/5 stars |
| Bustle | (Positive) |

Symptoms received positive reviews from music critics, with the only complaints pointing the album's short length. Monica Mercuri, writing for Forbes, called the album "unapologetically personal and incredibly good". Alani Vargas, writing for Bustle, described the album as "highly personal". Ineye Komonibo, writing for Marie Claire, referred to the record as "emotionally-charged" and a "candid and vulnerable account of what it feels like to go through [anxiety] — and a passionate reminder that you're never alone". Komonibo also deemed it Tisdale's "most thoughtful, mature release yet".

== Track listing ==
Adapted from iTunes.

| No. | Title | Writer(s) | Length |
|---|---|---|---|
| 1. | "Symptoms" | Ashley Tisdale; John Feldmann; Scot Stewart; Dylan McLean; Rachel West | 2:54 |
| 2. | "Looking Glass" | Tisdale; Feldmann; Stewart; McLean; West | 2:37 |
| 3. | "Love Me & Let Me Go" | Tisdale; Feldmann; Stewart; McLean; Whitney Phillips | 2:46 |
| 4. | "Insomnia" | Tisdale; Feldmann; Stewart; McLean; Fiona Bevan | 2:54 |
| 5. | "Vibrations" | Tisdale; Feldmann; Stewart; McLean; West | 2:23 |
| 6. | "Under Pressure" | Tisdale; Feldmann; Stewart; McLean; West | 2:33 |
| 7. | "True Romance" | Tisdale; Feldmann; Stewart; McLean; West | 2:34 |
| 8. | "Voices in My Head" | Tisdale; Feldmann; Stewart; McLean; Phillips | 3:19 |
| 9. | "Feeling So Good" | Tisdale; Feldmann; Stewart; McLean; West | 3:07 |
| Total length: | | | 25:07 |

== Charts ==
| Chart (2019) | Peak position |
|---|---|
| France Download Albums (SNEP) | 53 |
| UK Download Albums (OCC) | 52 |
| US Independent Albums (Billboard) | 22 |
| US Top Current Album Sales (Billboard) | 96 |
