= Gold (Kiiara song) =

Single by Kiiara

from the EP Low Kii Savage
- Released: October 26, 2015
- Recorded: 2015
- Genre: Electropop; trap
- Length: 3:45
- Label: Atlantic
- Songwriters: Kiara Saulters; David Singer-Vine
- Producer: Felix Snow

Kiiara singles chronology
"Gold" (2015)	"Feels" (2016)

Music video
- "Gold" on YouTube

"Gold" is the debut single by American singer Kiiara, released on October 26, 2015. It was the lead single from her debut extended play (EP) Low Kii Savage (2016) and was also included on her debut studio album, Lil Kiiwi (2020). Commercially, the single was a sleeper hit, becoming her first entry on the US Billboard Hot 100, peaking at number 13. A remix featuring Lil Wayne was released on November 18, 2016.

== Background ==
Kiiara first wrote "Gold" on a classical guitar in 2014. The song was based on a childhood lesson of not having to answer to anybody: "It just seemed right; it fell out of my mouth when I wrote it." Then, a producer named Felix Snow made an electro-pop twist of the song that was more vibe-oriented and less lyrical than Kiiara's classical acoustic version. Another co-writer the singer worked with, preferring the classical acoustic version over Snow's rendition, recommended doing a mixture of both types of songs. The artist originally planned to name the song "W.E.L.Y.K," acronym for "without ever letting you know," but ultimately decided on "Gold" after finding the initial title too "trendy."

== Release ==
The track was first released on SoundCloud in the summer of 2015; at the time, Kiiara kept her real identity unknown for the music to be focused on. A day later, she garnered a swarm of emails from several major labels and signed with Atlantic. Shortly after, it, as well as "Feels," played on the first week of Zane Lowe's Beats 1 show.

By July 2016, "Gold" had garnered 188 million Spotify plays.

== Composition ==
According to the sheet music published at musicnotes.com, the song is written in F minor, with a moderate tempo of 84–88 beats per minute. It features a prominent glitchy vocal sound effect that appears throughout the chorus. This effect was done by producer Felix Snow who took portions of the pre-chorus and added them to an MPC, giving the song its distinctive trill sound. Musically, "Gold" is an electropop and trap song that contains elements of snap as well as Alt-pop beats. The song's verses are backed by a finger-click beat with double and triple-timed hi-hats in the chorus, along with a bassline and contains synths and vocal effects.

== Critical reception ==
"Gold" received positive reviews. Website Renowned for Sound described the song as an "electrifying mix" between Scandinavian electropop and Atlanta trap. Carl Williott of Idolator stated "The Illinois singer sounds a bit like Ellie Goulding crossed with Lorde, and she was wise to pair up with SZA collaborator Felix Snow, who has given the track a nice balance of snappy percussion and warped atmospherics. The most intriguing part, though, would be the chorus. It's equal parts disorienting and addictive, and the bold choice suggests she knows exactly what she wants to accomplish with this project." Stereogum's Tom Breihan claimed that "[Gold] feels like some fascinating new mutation of bedroom-pop music," and said that it "takes cues from icy R&B and from glitched-out, spacey dance music, but it also has the wide-open heart of a classic pop song."

Billboard ranked "Gold" at number 69 on their Billboard's 100 Best Pop Songs of 2016" commenting "With Lorde (hopefully) still working on her much-anticipated second LP, Kiiara stepped in with the minimalist snap-pop jam of the year – giving everyone "Royals" flashbacks, right down to the gold teeth. Still, not even Ella Yelich-O'Connor [Lorde] ever boasted a groove or chorus this cold, with the booming simplicity of early Run-DMC and the tech-garbled vocals of prime Art of Noise."

== Commercial performance ==
"Gold" debuted at number 96 on the US Billboard Hot 100 issued for June 11, 2016. The song peaked at number 13 in its 20th week on the chart and charted for 27 weeks in total. The Recording Industry Association of America (RIAA) certified it 3× Platinum, which denotes three million units based on sales and track-equivalent on-demand streams. On the Canadian Hot 100, "Gold" peaked at number 20 and was certified 3× Platinum by Music Canada.

The song reached number five in Australia and was certified 2× Platinum. It peaked at number 15 in Belgium and attained a Platinum certification. "Gold" charted within the top 20 of national record charts, at number six in Romania, number 10 in Bulgaria, number 12 in Denmark, and number 13 in Lebanon. The song was certified 3× Platinum in New Zealand, and Platinum in Brazil, Denmark, Italy, and the United Kingdom, as well as Gold in Germany.

== Charts ==
=== Weekly charts ===
Weekly chart positions for "Gold"
Chart (2015–17)	Peak position
Australia (ARIA)	5
Austria (Ö3 Austria Top 40)	50
Belgium (Ultratop 50 Flanders)	15
Belgium (Ultratip Bubbling Under Wallonia)	4
Bulgaria (PROPHON)	10
Canada Hot 100 (Billboard)	20
Canada Hot AC (Billboard)	47
Canada CHR/Top 40 (Billboard)	8
Czech Republic Singles Digital (ČNS IFPI)	27
Denmark (Tracklisten)	12
Germany (GfK)	42
Hungary (Stream Top 40)	25
Ireland (IRMA)	32
Italy (FIMI)	53
Lebanon (Lebanese Top 20)	13
Netherlands (Global Top 40)	28
Netherlands (Single Top 100)	56
Netherlands (Tipparade)	2
New Zealand (Recorded Music NZ)	22
Portugal (AFP)	36
Romania (Media Forest)	6
Scottish Singles Sales (Official Charts)	37
Slovakia Singles Digital (ČNS IFPI)	25
Sweden (Sverigetopplistan)	29
Switzerland (Schweizer Hitparade)	53
UK Singles (Official Charts)	48
US Billboard Hot 100	13
US Adult Pop Airplay (Billboard)	20
US Pop Airplay (Billboard)	5
US Rhythmic Airplay (Billboard)	9

=== Year-end charts ===
2016 year-end chart positions for "Gold"
Chart (2016)	Position
Australia (ARIA)	26
Belgium (Ultratop Flanders)	49
Canada (Canadian Hot 100)	53
Denmark (Tracklisten)	85
Netherlands (Global Top 40)	54
New Zealand (Recorded Music NZ)	34
Sweden (Sverigetopplistan)	93
Switzerland (Schweizer Hitparade)	91
US Billboard Hot 100	52
US Mainstream Top 40 (Billboard)	28

2017 year-end chart position for "Gold"
Chart (2017)	Position
Romania (Airplay 100)	17

== Certifications ==
Certifications for "Gold"
Region	Certification	Certified units/sales
Australia (ARIA)	2× Platinum	140,000^{‡}
Belgium (BRMA)	Platinum	20,000^{‡}
Brazil (Pro-Música Brasil)	Platinum	60,000^{‡}
Canada (Music Canada)	4× Platinum	320,000^{‡}
Denmark (IFPI Danmark)	Platinum	60,000^{^}
Germany (BVMI)	Gold	200,000^{‡}
Italy (FIMI)	Platinum	50,000^{‡}
New Zealand (RMNZ)	3× Platinum	90,000^{‡}
Poland (ZPAV)	Platinum	50,000^{‡}
United Kingdom (BPI)	Platinum	600,000^{‡}
United States (RIAA)	3× Platinum	3,000,000^{‡}
^{^} Shipments figures based on certification alone.^{‡} Sales+streaming figures based on certification alone.

== Release history ==
Release dates and format(s) for "Gold"
Region	Date	Format	Label	Ref.
Worldwide	June 17, 2015	Streaming	Atlantic	
Worldwide	October 26, 2015	Digital download	Atlantic; Warner	
Italy	April 15, 2016	Mainstream radio	Atlantic	
United States	May 10, 2016	Mainstream radio	Atlantic; Warner	

== Media usage ==
"Gold" is on the soundtrack of NBA 2K17. It is also used as a background music in the evening gown segment of Miss Universe 2016.
