= Unfortunately, Terror Jr =

Studio album by Terror Jr
- Released: January 25, 2019
- Recorded: 2017–2018
- Genre: Pop
- Length: 45:59
- Labels: Effess; Atlantic
- Producers: Campa; DallasK; Infinity; Joel Little; Lincoln Jesser; Michel Schulz; Ronny J; Shawn Wasabi; Simon Says; The Stereotypes; Wax Motif; Wendy Wang

Terror Jr chronology
Bop 3: The Girl Who Cried Purple (2017)	Unfortunately, Terror Jr (2019)	Come Outside and Break Your Heart (2019)

Singles from Unfortunately, Terror Jr
- 1. "Heaven Wasn't Made for Me" Released: July 13, 2018; 2. "A-OK (Everything's Perfect)" Released: September 27, 2018; 3. "Pretty" Released: January 18, 2019; 4. "Terrified" Released: January 25, 2019

Unfortunately, Terror Jr is the debut studio album by American pop duo Terror Jr, released on January 25, 2019, through Effess and Atlantic Records. It was supported by the singles "Heaven Wasn't Made for Me", "A-OK (Everything's Perfect)", and "Terrified".

== Background ==
David Singer-Vine revealed that the duo started out with over 100 songs, and in order to reduce the number to 15, they kept only those that "closely represented who they wanted to be in terms of future growth", with Singer-Vine stating "We want to be great. [...] These songs on this album, it's a departure in a sense of the scale of it all. I think this is the grandest we've appeared." The process took over a year, and the duo said in a press release that "There are no soft moments on our album and that's intentional... We don't want to be background music... The point is to engage. We hope that people listen to these songs with questions and come out with answers."

Lisa Vitale said of the album title: "I kind of think of it as the signature at the end of a letter. It's signed from us to the world. There is a bit of darkness and melancholy to a lot of the songs and to the state of the world right now. Even though they sound happy, when you look closely, it's a reflection on how we feel."

== Critical reception ==
Newsweek called the album "a bubblegum ode to modern culture" that includes "blunt statements on politics", "a blatant Trump mention", and "deep, eerie and melancholy messages and images" that "defines" the duo "as something larger than pop as we know it". Highsnobiety called the album "delicious" and "even juicier than you could have imagined". Billboard said the album features "the duo combining their danceable sound with sociopolitical themes, such as women's reproductive rights, LGBT rights and substance abuse", highlighting the line "These days got me in a slump/ White women voted for Trump" in "A-OK (Everything's Perfect)". Paper called the song "Pretty" a "dark, contemptuous take on the ennui of living in a female body", saying it "feels refreshing and rebellious".

== Track listing ==
Track listing adapted from AllMusic.

No.	Title	Writer(s)	Producer(s)	Length
1.	"Maker"	Lisa Vitale; David Singer-Vine; Dallas Koehlke	Campa; DallasK	3:24
2.	"Losers R Lovers"	Vitale; Singer-Vine; Koehlke; Gabriel Liebowitz	DallasK	2:57
3.	"Yamaguchi"	Vitale; Singer-Vine; Justin Tranter; Nyle LeBlanc; Shawn Serrano	Shawn Wasabi	3:03
4.	"Terrified"	Vitale; Singer-Vine; Michael Pollack; Simon Rosen	Simon Says	2:58
5.	"Pretty"	Vitale; Singer-Vine; Joel Little	Campa; Little	3:15
6.	"Heaven Wasn't Made for Me"	Vitale; Singer-Vine; John Downey; Lincoln Jesser	Jesser	2:53
7.	"Have You"	Vitale; Singer-Vine; Downey; Oscar Gorres; James Alan Ghaleb	Wendy Wang	3:03
8.	"Hungoverheadcrack"	Vitale; Singer-Vine; Jordan Suecof	Campa; Infinity	2:46
9.	"Little Bit"	Vitale; Singer-Vine; Mauricio Rengifo; Andrés Torres	Rengifo; Torres	3:03
10.	"Loner"	Vitale; Singer-Vine; Whitney Philips; Jonathan Yip; Raymond Romolus; Jeremy Reeves; Ray Charles McCollough II	The Stereotypes	3:18
11.	"Kinda Iconic"	Vitale; Singer-Vine; Wendy Wang	Campa; Wang	2:33
12.	"A-OK (Everything's Perfect)"	Vitale; Singer-Vine; Daniel Chein; Jesser; Liebowitz; Tony Rodini	Campa; Jesser; Wax Motif	3:33
13.	"Favorite Bitch"	Vitale; Singer-Vine; Coleridge Tillman; Michael Schulz	Mike Schulz	3:10
14.	"Isolation"	Vitale; Singer-Vine; Ronald Spence	Campa; Ronny J	3:01
15.	"Happy Place"	Vitale; Singer-Vine; Wang	Wang	3:02
Total length:				45:59
