= Bundesvision Song Contest 2009 =

German music competition

Date and venue
- Final: 13 February 2009
- Venue: Metropolis-Halle, Potsdam, Brandenburg

Organisation
- Presenters: Stefan Raab; Johanna Klum; Elton (green room
- Participation map: Legend; 1st place 2nd place 3rd place 4th place 5th place 6th place 7th place 8th place 9th place 10th place 11th place 12th place 13th place 14th place 15th place 16th place

Vote
- Voting system: Each state awards 12, 10, 8–1 points to their top 10 songs.
- Winning song: Berlin "Schwarz zu blau" by Peter Fox

The Bundesvision Song Contest 2009 was the fifth edition of the annual Bundesvision Song Contest musical event. The contest was held on 13 February 2009 at the Metropolis-Halle in Potsdam, Brandenburg, following Subway to Sally's win in the 2008 contest in Lower Saxony with the song "Auf Kiel". The contest was hosted by Stefan Raab, Johanna Klum, and Elton in the green room. This was the first contest in which a public service broadcaster, Bayern 3, supported the contest.

== Contest overview ==
The participants and their states were announced between 19 January and 12 February 2009 on TV total.

The winner of the Bundesvision Song Contest 2009 was Peter Fox with the song "Schwarz zu blau", representing Berlin, the state's second win. In second place was Polarkreis 18 representing Saxony, and third place to Rage representing North Rhine-Westphalia. Fox had already participated in the Bundesvision Song Contest 2006 as part of winning band Seeed which also represented Berlin. Chapeau Claque had also represented Thuringia in 2007 along with Northern Lite.Sven van Thom competed in 2007 also for Brandenburg as part of Beatplanet.

10 of the 16 states awarded themselves the maximum of 12 points, with Brandenburg, Lower Saxony, North Rhine-Westphalia, Rhineland-Palatinate, Saxony-Anhalt, and Schleswig-Holstein awarding themselves 10 points each.

== Results ==
Bundesvision Song Contest 2009
R/O	State	Artist	Song	English translation	Points	Place
1	Hesse	Fräulein Wunder	"Sternradio"	Star radio	53	6
2	Saarland	P:lot	"Mein Name ist"	My name is	21	14
3	Mecklenburg-Vorpommern	Marteria	"Zum König geboren"	Born to be king	23	12
4	Saxony-Anhalt	Angela's Park	"Generation Monoton"	Generation Monotone	10	16
5	North Rhine-Westphalia	Rage	"Gib dich nie auf"	Never give yourself up	112	3
6	Thuringia	Chapeau Claque	"Pandora (Kiss Miss Tragedy)"	—	53	6
7	Brandenburg	Sven van Thom	"Jaqueline (ich hab Berlin gekauft)"	Jaqueline (I've bought Berlin)	37	9
8	Bavaria	Claudia Koreck	"I wui dass du woasst"	I want you to know	34	10
9	Schleswig-Holstein	Ruben Cossani	"Bis auf letzte Nacht"	Except for last night	44	8
10	Lower Saxony	Fotos	"Du fehlst mir"	I'm missing you	12	15
11	Bremen	Flowin Immo et les Freaqz	"Urlaub am Attersee"	Holidays on the Attersee	25	11
12	Rhineland-Palatinate	Pascal Finkenauer	"Unter Grund"	Underground	23	12
13	Saxony	Polarkreis 18	"The Colour of Snow"	—	131	2
14	Baden-Württemberg	Cassandra Steen	"Darum leben wir"	That's why we live	103	4
15	Hamburg	Olli Schulz	"Mach den Bibo"	Do the Big Bird	73	5
16	Berlin	Peter Fox	"Schwarz zu blau"	Black to blue	174	1

== Scoreboard ==
	Voting results																
Hesse	53	12	2	1	4	4	5	3	5	1	1		5	5	5		
Saarland	21		12			5	1						3				
Mecklenburg-Vorpommern	23		5	12						2						2	2
Saxony-Anhalt	10				10												
North Rhine-Westphalia	112	7	8	7	7	10	7	7	7	6	7	5	7	8	7	6	6
Thuringia	53	5	4	2	5		12	5	3			4	1	7	2		3
Brandenburg	37	1		3	3	1	3	10	2	3				4			7
Bavaria	34	4	1			2	2	1	12			2	2	1	6		1
Schleswig-Holstein	44			5	2	3	4	2	1	10	3	3		2	1	8	
Lower Saxony	12										10	1				1	
Bremen	25	2									4	12				3	4
Rhineland-Palatinate	23									4	2		10		3	4	
Saxony	131	8	7	8	8	8	8	8	8	7	8	8	8	12	8	7	10
Baden-Württemberg	103	6	6	6	6	7	6	6	6	5	5	7	6	6	12	5	8
Hamburg	73	3	3	4	1	6		4	4	8	6	6	4	3	4	12	5
Berlin	174	10	10	10	12	12	10	12	10	12	12	10	12	10	10	10	12
