= Stadtaffe =

Studio album by Peter Fox
- Released: 26 September 2008
- Recorded: 2007–2008
- Genre: German hip hop; dancehall; pop rap; ragga; neo soul
- Length: 43:25
- Label: Downbeat; Warner Music Group
- Producer: Fox; The Krauts

Peter Fox chronology
Stadtaffe (2008)	Love Songs (2023)

Singles from Stadtaffe
- 1. "Alles neu" Released: 15 August 2008; 2. "Haus am See" Released: 18 October 2008; 3. "Schwarz zu blau" Released: 5 February 2009

Professional ratings
Review scores
Source	Rating
AllMusic	3.5/5 stars
Laut.de	4/5 stars
Musikexpress	4.5/6 stars

Stadtaffe (German pronunciation: [ˈʃtatˌʔafə], lit. “urban ape”) is the first solo album by German musician Peter Fox. Released 26 September 2008, the standard version contains twelve tracks, four of which have been released as singles. Fox performed the single Schwarz zu blau at the Bundesvision Song Contest 2009 in Potsdam while representing Berlin, and won, becoming the first person to win the contest twice (his first win coming in 2006 as a member of the band Seeed). The album was certified 6× platinum for shipping 1.2 million copies in Germany and is the third-most-downloaded album of all time there, selling 100,000 copies from downloads only.

In 2009, Fox stated that Stadtaffe would remain his only solo album. In April 2023, however, he announced the release of his second album Love Songs for May 2023.

Musikexpress voted Stadtaffe 19th on the list of the 100 best German albums of all time.

== Chart performance ==
Stadtaffe entered the German albums chart at number 4 and reached its peak position number 1, which it reached on four non-consecutive occasions. It managed to stay in the top 10 for a total of 41 weeks and stayed in the top 50 for 92 weeks.

== Track listing ==
No.	Title	Lyrics	Music	Length
1.	"Alles neu"	Pierre Baigorry, David Conen	Baigorry, Conen, Dmitri Shostakovich, Vincent von Schlippenbach	4:18
2.	"Schwarz zu blau"	Baigorry, Conen	Baigorry, Conen, Von Schlippenbach	3:36
3.	"Haus am See"	Baigorry, Conen	Baigorry, Conen, Von Schlippenbach, Ruth-Maria Renner	3:36
4.	"Kopf verloren"	Baigorry, Conen	Baigorry, Conen, Von Schlippenbach, Grace Risch	3:22
5.	"Das zweite Gesicht"	Baigorry, Conen	Baigorry, Conen, Von Schlippenbach	3:53
6.	"Der letzte Tag"	Baigorry, Conen	Baigorry, Conen, Von Schlippenbach, Risch	3:43
7.	"Ich Steine, du Steine"	Baigorry, Conen	Baigorry, Conen, Von Schlippenbach, Risch, Renner	3:17
8.	"Lok auf 2 Beinen"	Baigorry, Conen	Baigorry, Conen, Von Schlippenbach	3:44
9.	"Stadtaffe"	Baigorry, Conen	Baigorry, Conen, Von Schlippenbach	3:40
10.	"Fieber" (feat. K.I.Z)	Baigorry, Conen, Nico Seyfried, Tarek Ebéné, Maxim Drüner	Baigorry, Conen, Von Schlippenbach	4:14
11.	"Schüttel deinen Speck"	Baigorry, Conen, Nacio Herb Brown, Arthur Freed	Baigorry, Conen, Von Schlippenbach, Brown, Freed	2:51
12.	"Zucker" (feat. Vanessa Mason)	Baigorry, Conen	Baigorry, Conen, Von Schlippenbach, Renner	3:17
13.	"Shostakovitchovitch" (iTunes only bonus track)		Baigorry, Conen, Von Schlippenbach	4:14
14.	"Saint Tropez" (iTunes only bonus track)		Baigorry, Conen, Von Schlippenbach, Renner	3:36

The song Alles neu with its violin riff from Shostakovich's Symphony No. 7 was sampled by both Plan B (Ill Manors) and Raffy L'z.

== Charts ==
=== Weekly charts ===
Chart (2008)	Peak position
Austrian Albums (Ö3 Austria)	1
Dutch Albums (Album Top 100)	10
Belgian Albums (Ultratop Flanders)	13
German Albums (Offizielle Top 100)	1
Swiss Albums (Schweizer Hitparade)	4

Chart (2026)	Peak position
German Pop Albums (Offizielle Top 100)	8

=== Year-end charts ===
Chart (2008)	Position
Austrian Albums (Ö3 Austria)	48
German Albums (Offizielle Top 100)	39
Chart (2009)	Position
Austrian Albums (Ö3 Austria)	3
Dutch Albums (Album Top 100)	100
German Albums (Offizielle Top 100)	1
Swiss Albums (Schweizer Hitparade)	22
Chart (2010)	Position
Austrian Albums (Ö3 Austria)	29
German Albums (Offizielle Top 100)	49
Chart (2021)	Position
German Albums (Offizielle Top 100)	78
Chart (2022)	Position
German Albums (Offizielle Top 100)	29
Chart (2023)	Position
Austrian Albums (Ö3 Austria)	56
German Albums (Offizielle Top 100)	28
Chart (2024)	Position
German Albums (Offizielle Top 100)	27

== Certifications ==
Region	Certification	Certified units/sales
Austria (IFPI Austria)	2× Platinum	40,000^{*}
Germany (BVMI)	15× Gold	1,500,000^{‡}
Switzerland (IFPI Switzerland)	Gold	15,000^{^}
^{*} Sales figures based on certification alone.^{^} Shipments figures based on certification alone.^{‡} Sales+streaming figures based on certification alone.
