= Glück und Benzin =

Studio album by Miss Platnum
- Released: March 14, 2014
- Recorded: 2010–2014
- Genre: Electro-R&B; pop; hip hop
- Length: 52:14
- Label: Four; Sony
- Producer: The Krauts; Miss Platnum; Flitzpiepen

Miss Platnum chronology
The Sweetest Hangover (2009)	Glück und Benzin (2014)	Ich war hier (2015)

Glück und Benzin (German: Luck and Gasoline) is the fourth studio album by German recording artist Miss Platnum, released by Four Music on March 14, 2014 in German-speaking Europe. Her first German-language album, it marked a transition from the hip hop-driven Balkan pop style from her previous records, Chefa (2007) and The Sweetest Hangover (2009). Largely inspired by her 2012 number-one hit single "Lila Wolken" with rappers Marteria and Yasha, the album incorporates contemporary R&B and electropop styles with elements from other genres of music, including dance and PBR&B.

Platnum again enlisted longtime collaborators David Conen, Vincent von Schlippenbach, and Dirk Berger from production trio The Krauts to work with her on Gluck und Benzin. Upon its release, the album received generally mixed to positive reviews. It debuted at number thirty-four on the German Albums Chart.

== Track listing ==
No.	Title	Producer(s)	Length
1.	"99 Probleme"	The Krauts; Platnum	3:09
2.	"Gläser an die Wand"	The Krauts; Platnum	4:04
3.	"Letzter Tanz"	The Krauts; Platnum	6:01
4.	"Frau Berg"	The Krauts; Platnum	4:36
5.	"Nur die Liebe"	The Krauts; Platnum	3:34
6.	"Glück & Benzin" (featuring Yasha)	The Krauts; Platnum	3:51
7.	"Hüftgold" (featuring Nico K.I.Z)	The Krauts; Flitzpiepen; Platnum	4:36
8.	"Spiegelschriift"	The Krauts; Platnum	3:09
9.	"Kleiner Schmerz"	The Krauts; Platnum	4:13
10.	"Perfekte Illusion"	The Krauts; Platnum	3:17
11.	"Mein Kleid"	The Krauts; Platnum	4:22
12.	"1000 Jahre telefonieren" (featuring Marsimoto)	The Krauts; Platnum	7:22
Total length:			52:14

== Charts ==
Chart (2014)	Peak position
German Albums (Offizielle Top 100)	34
