= Next! =

Studio album by Seeed
- Released: October 14, 2005
- Genre: Reggae fusion
- Length: 45:31
- Language: English, German
- Label: Warner Music Group

Seeed chronology
Music Monks (2003)	Next! (2005)	Seeed (2011)

Singles from Next!
- 1. "Aufstehn!" Released: August 22, 2005; 2. "Schwinger" Released: November 25, 2005; 3. "Ding" Released: February 1, 2006; 4. "Slowlife" Released: November 3, 2006

Professional ratings
Review scores
Source	Rating
musicOMH	4/5 stars

Next! is the third studio album by German reggae fusion band Seeed. It was released on 14 October 2005.

== Track listing ==
No.	Title	Lyrics	Music	Production	Length
1.	"Schwinger"	Baigorry, Nabé, Dellé	Jackson, Baigorry, Based, DJ Illvibe, Berger, Dellé, Nabé	Baigorry	3:20
2.	"Next...!!"	Baigorry, Nabé, Dellé, Butt	Baigorry, DJ Ilvibe, Based, Risch, Nabé, Dellé	DJ Illvibe, Based, Baigorry	3:06
3.	"Aufstehn!"	Baigorry, Dellé, Callaway	Baigorry, Bugnon, Callaway, Dellé	Baigorry	3:51
4.	"Stand Up"	Baigorry, Dellé, Nabé	Rheinbay, Baigorry	Rheinbay, Seeed, Involtini	2:38
5.	"Tight Pants"	Baigorry, Nabé, Dellé, Conen	Baigorry, Nabé, Dellé, Conen	Baigorry	3:06
6.	"Please"	Nabé, Hall	Nabé, Reibold, DJ Illvibe	Reibold, Nabé, DJ Illvibe	3:36
7.	"Ocean's 11"	Baigorry, Nabé, Dellé, Butt	DJ Illvibe, Baigorry, Bugnon, Reibold, Risch, Nabé, Dellé, Involtini	DJ Illvibe, Baigorry	2:53
8.	"Can't Hold Me"	Baigorry, Dellé, Nabé, Butt	Kusserow, Baigorry, Delgado, Dellé, Nabé	Rudeboy, Baigorry	2:39
9.	"Goosebumps"	Dellé, Baigorry, Conen,	Dellé, Based, Kusserow, Bugnon, Baigorry, Reibold	Rudeboy, Based, Dellé	2:50
10.	"Slowlife"	Nabé, Baigorry, Dellé	Matuschewski, Nabé, Schneider, Lauber, Baigorry, Dellé	Boundzound	4:17
11.	"Ding"	Baigorry, Conen, Dellé, Nabé	Baigorry, DJ Illvibe, Based, Kusserow, Dellé, Nabé	Baigorry, DJ Illvibe, Based	3:25
12.	"She Got Me Twisted"	Baigorry, Nabé, Dellé	Baigorry, Nabé, Dellé, Bugnon	Baigorry	3:11
13.	"Light the Sun"	Nabé, Dellé	Nabé, Reibold, DJ Illvibe, Conen, Delgado, Based, Dellé	DJ Illvibe, Monk, Nabé	3:02
14.	"End of Days"	Nabé, Dellé, Village	Cordes, Reibold, Delgado, Based, Nabé, Dellé	Reibold, Cordes, Nabé	3:26
Total length:					45:31

Limited edition bonus tracks
No.	Title	Length
15.	"Elephant Man" ("Eadiat Badman" Refix)
16.	"T.O.K." ("Shake Wha' U Have" Refix)

== Credits ==
Writing, performance and production credits are adapted from the album liner notes.

=== Personnel ===
==== Seeed ====
- Pierre Baigorry a.k.a. Pete Fox – vocals
- Demba Nabé a.k.a. Ear – vocals
- Frank A. Dellé a.k.a. Eased – vocals
- DJ Luke – disc jockey
- Thorsten Reibold a.k.a. Dubmaster Reibold – keyboard
- Moritz "Mo" Delgado – saxophone
- Jerome "Tchamp" Bugnon – trombone
- Rüdiger Kusserow a.k.a. Rudeboy – guitar
- Tobias Cordes a.k.a. Tobsen Cordes – bass
- Alfi Trowers – percussions
- Sebastian Krajewski a.k.a. Based – drums

==== Guest musicians ====
- CeeLo Green – vocals on "Aufstehn!"
- Lady Saw – vocals on "Please"
- Maya Dela Gwada – vocals on "End of Days"

==== Additional musicians ====
- Grace – vocals on "Schwinger", "Next...!!", "Aufstehn!", "Stand Up", "Ocean's 11", "Goosebumps"
- Miss Platnum – vocals "Next...!!", "Aufstehn!", "Stand Up", "Tight Pants", "Ocean's 11", "Goosebumps"
- Nathalie Dorra – vocals on "Tight Pants"
- Beccy Boo – vocals on "Please"
- Richard Koch – trumpet on "Aufstehn!", "Goosebumps", "Ding"
- Charles Matuschewski – trumpet on "Slowlife"
- Dirk Berger – guitar on "Schwinger", "Next...!!"
- Jan Pelao – guitar on "Aufstehn!"
- Son of Dave – harp on "Next...!!"
- Vagner – berimbau on "End of Days"

==== Production ====
- Based – coproduction of "Schwinger", "She Got Me Twisted", "Light the Sun"
- Vincent von Schlippenbach a.k.a. DJ Illvibe (ex-Seeed) – coproduction of "Schwinger"
- Dubmaster Reibold – coproduction of "Aufstehn!", "Ocean's 11", "She Got Me Twisted", "Light the Sun"
- Dirk Berger – coproduction of "Ocean's 11"
- Olsen Involtini – coproduction of "Tight Pants", "Please", "Ocean's 11", "Goosebumps", "Slowlife", "Light the Sun"; Audio mixing of "Schwinger", "Stand Up", "Tight Pants", "Ocean's 11", "Goosebumps", "Slowlife", "Ding"
- Pierre Baigorry – coproduction of "Goosebumps", "Slowlife"; mixing of "Schwinger", "Tight Pants"
- Sebi Proffessionell – mixing of "Next...!!"
- Axel Niehaus – mixing of "Aufstehn!", "Please", "Light the Sun"
- George Brasch – mixing of "Can't Hold Me", "She Got Me Twisted", "End of Days"
- Sascha Bühren a.k.a. Busy – mastering
- Chris Athens – mastering
- Tom Meyer – sequencing

==== Artwork and design ====
- Jaybo4MONK – artwork

=== Studios ===
- Seeedbase I, Berlin, Germany – production, recording of "Schwinger", "Next...!!", "Aufstehn!", "Stand Up", "Tight Pants", "Ocean's 11", "Can't Hold Me", "Goosebumps", "Slowlife", "Ding", "She Got Me Twisted", "Light the Sun"
- Seeedbase II, Berlin, Germany – production, recording of "Schwinger", "Aufstehn!", "Stand Up", "Ocean's 11", "Goosebumps", "Slowlife", "She Got Me Twisted"
- Seeedbase III, Berlin, Germany – production, recording of "Next...!!", "Please", "Goosebumps", "Ding", "Light the Sun"
- Seeedbase IV, Berlin, Germany – production, recording of "Next...!!", "Please", "Ocean's 11", "Can't Hold Me", "She Got Me Twisted", "Light the Sun", "End of Days"
- Seeedbase V, Berlin, Germany – production, recording of "Can't Hold Me", "Goosebumps", "End of Days"
- Maze Studios, Atlanta – production, recording of "Aufstehn!"
- Pow Pow Studio, Cologne, Germany – production, recording of "Stand Up"
- Boundzoundbase I, Berlin, Germany – production, recording of "Please", "Slowlife", "Light the Sun"
- Boundzoundbase II, Berlin, Germany – production, recording of "Slowlife"
- Transporterraum, Berlin, Germany – production, recording of "Slowlife"
- Quench-Field Studios – mixing of "Schwinger", "Stand Up", "Tight Pants", "Ocean's 11", "Goosebumps", "Slowlife", "Ding"
- Ochsenwerder Sturgeon Studio – mixing of "Next...!!"
- Tritonus Berlin – mixing of "Aufstehn!", "Please", "Light the Sun"
- Gompa Studio – mixing of "Can't Hold Me", "She Got Me Twisted", "End of Days"
- Sterling Sound – mastering
- Master & Servant HH – sequencing

== Charts ==
=== Weekly charts ===
Chart (2005–06)	Peak position
Austrian Albums (Ö3 Austria)	3
French Albums (SNEP)	71
German Albums (Offizielle Top 100)	2
Swiss Albums (Schweizer Hitparade)	11

=== Year-end charts ===
Chart (2005)	Position
Austrian Albums (Ö3 Austria)	64

Chart (2006)	Position
Austrian Albums (Ö3 Austria)	26
German Albums (Offizielle Top 100)	34

== Certifications ==
Region	Certification	Certified units/sales
Austria (IFPI Austria)	Gold	15,000^{*}
Germany (BVMI)	3× Gold	300,000^{^}
^{*} Sales figures based on certification alone.^{^} Shipments figures based on certification alone.
