= Love Songs (Peter Fox album) =

Studio album by Peter Fox
- Released: 26 May 2023
- Genres: Pop; Hip-Hop; Dancehall; Afrobeat
- Length: 35:23
- Languages: German; Italian
- Label: Warner
- Producers: Peter Fox; The Krauts; Cracker Mallo; Emeka Emele Onuoha; Ghanaian Stallion

Peter Fox chronology
Live aus Berlin (2009)	Love Songs (2023)

Singles from Love Songs
- 1. "Zukunft Pink" Released: 20 October 2022; 2. "Vergessen wie" Released: 3 March 2023; 3. "Weiße Fahnen" Released: 17 March 2023; 4. "Ein Auge blau" Released: 14 April 2023

Love Songs is the second studio album by German musician Peter Fox. It was released on 26 May 2023 through Warner.

It debuted atop the charts in Germany, Austria and Switzerland, becoming Fox's second number-one album in Germany and Austria, as well as his first in Switzerland. The album features guest appearances by Benji Asare, Adriano Celentano and Inéz of Ätna.

== Background ==
After the release of his debut Stadtaffe in 2008 to massive commercial success, Fox announced he was quitting his solo career in July 2009. Following a farewell tour, the artist continued work with Seeed with whom he released two studio albums in 2012 and 2019, respectively. On 19 October 2022, Fox broke his silence and teased a comeback on his social media. "Zukunft Pink", his first solo single in nearly 14 years, was released on 20 October. It became his first number-one single in Germany and reached the top 5 in Austria. Fox released three more singles in the months preceding the album release: "Vergessen wie", "Weiße Fahnen" and "Ein Auge blau".

The album was announced on 26 April 2023. Tour and festival dates from May to September 2023 promoting the record were published days later.

== Critical reception ==
Professional ratings
Review scores
Source	Rating
laut.de	3/5 stars
Musikexpress	4.5/6 stars

The album received generally favourable reviews. Josephine Maria Bayer of laut.de thought the album was "way less exciting" than its predecessor but "holds up well" considering the high expectations. Aida Baghernejad at Musikexpress opined that the record was an invitation to dance through a "mix of genres", mainly consisting of Dancehall and Afrobeats. Likewise, Stern described the tracks as "extremely danceable".

== Track listing ==
All tracks produced by Peter Fox and The Krauts. "Ein Auge blau" was produced along with Ghanaian Stallion and "Toscana Fanboys" with Cracker Mallo and Emeka Emele Onuoha.

Love Songs track listing
No.	Title	Writer(s)	Length
1.	"Ein Auge blau"	Pierre Baigorry; Alan Mensah; David Conen; Julian Williams; Oliver Otubanjo; Vincent von Schlippenbach	3:02
2.	"Tuff Cookie"	Baigorry; Conen; von Schlippenbach; Bernard Reed; Cristopher Davids; Felix Kummer; Jack Andrew Sibley; John Moore; Lars Hammerstein; Liam Ivora; Sebastian Zenke	2:46
3.	"Kein Regen in Dubai"	Baigorry; Conen; von Schlippenbach; Kummer; Benjamin Asare; Gunter Papperitz; Jan Burkamp; Moses Yoofee	3:30
4.	"Disney"	Baigorry; Conen; von Schlippenbach; Kummer; Asare; Oliver Otubanjo	3:39
5.	"Celebration" (featuring Benji Asare)	Baigorry; Conen; von Schlippenbach; Asare	4:19
6.	"Vergessen wie"	Baigorry; Conen; von Schlippenbach; Kummer; Asare; Daniel Stoyanov	3:44
7.	"Dawn of the Dawn"	Baigorry; Conen; von Schlippenbach; Asare	1:24
8.	"Gegengift"	Baigorry; Conen; von Schlippenbach; Kummer; Arnim Teutoburg-Weiß; Moses Yoofee; Philipp Gruetering; Sebastian Dürre	3:00
9.	"Weiße Fahnen"	Baigorry; Conen; von Schlippenbach; Asare; Moses Yoofee Vester; Roman Klobe Baranga; Stefan Richter	3:34
10.	"Toscana Fanboys" (featuring Adriano Celentano)	Baigorry; Adriano Celentano; Conen; Asare; Cracker Mallo; Emeka Emele Onuoha	2:29
11.	"Zukunft Pink" (featuring Inéz)	Baigorry; Conen; von Schlippenbach; Charles Malo Josek; Guy Solomon Josek; Jakob Grunert; Louis Amon Josek; Torsten Schroth	3:51
Total length:			35:23

== Charts ==
=== Weekly charts ===
Weekly chart performance for Love Songs
Chart (2023)	Peak position
Austrian Albums (Ö3 Austria)	1
German Albums (Offizielle Top 100)	1
Swiss Albums (Schweizer Hitparade)	1

=== Year-end charts ===
2023 year-end chart performance for Love Songs
Chart (2023)	Position
Austrian Albums (Ö3 Austria)	44
German Albums (Offizielle Top 100)	11
Swiss Albums (Schweizer Hitparade)	81

2024 year-end chart performance of Love Songs
Chart (2024)	Position
German Albums (Offizielle Top 100)	68
