= List of number-one hits of 2009 (Germany) =

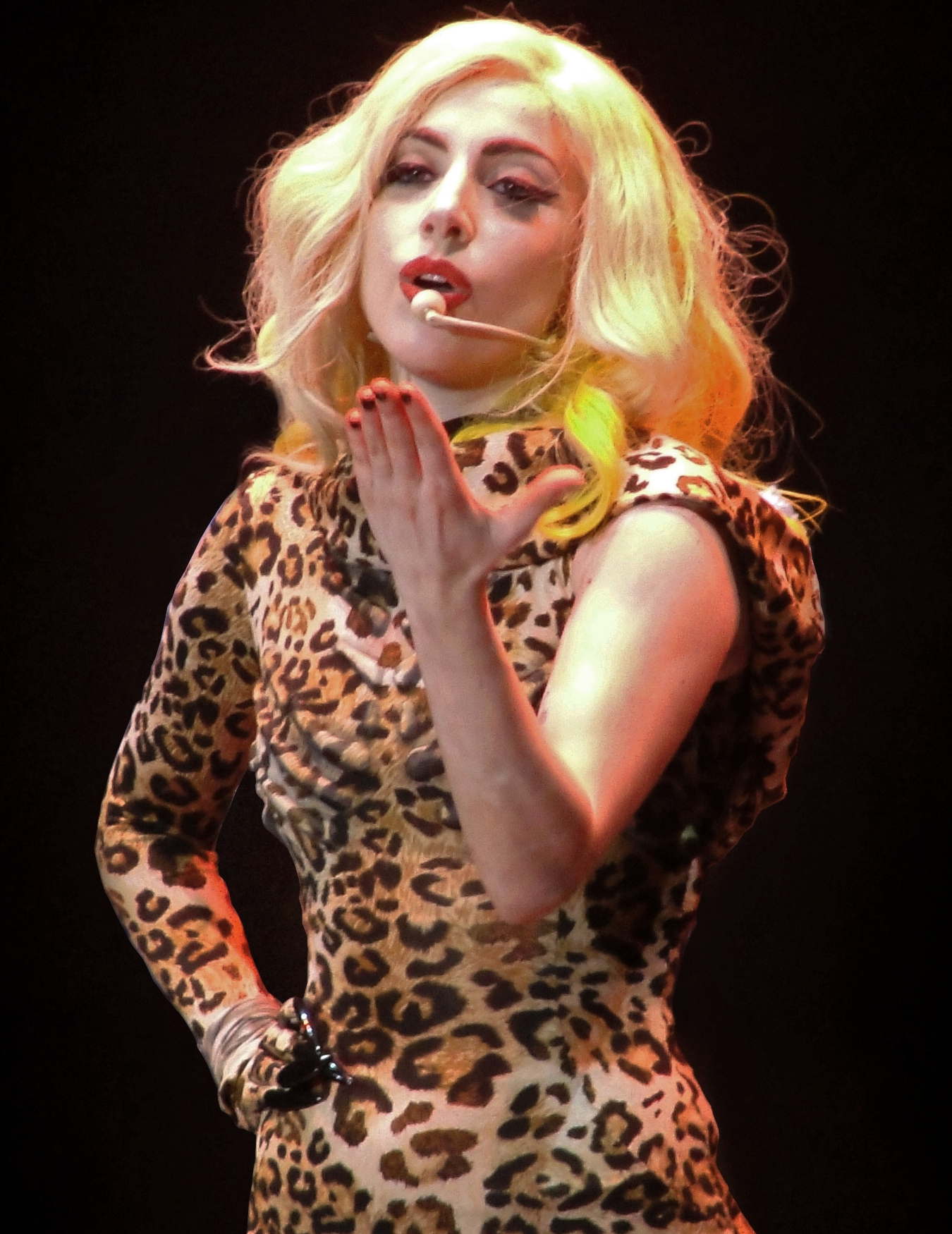
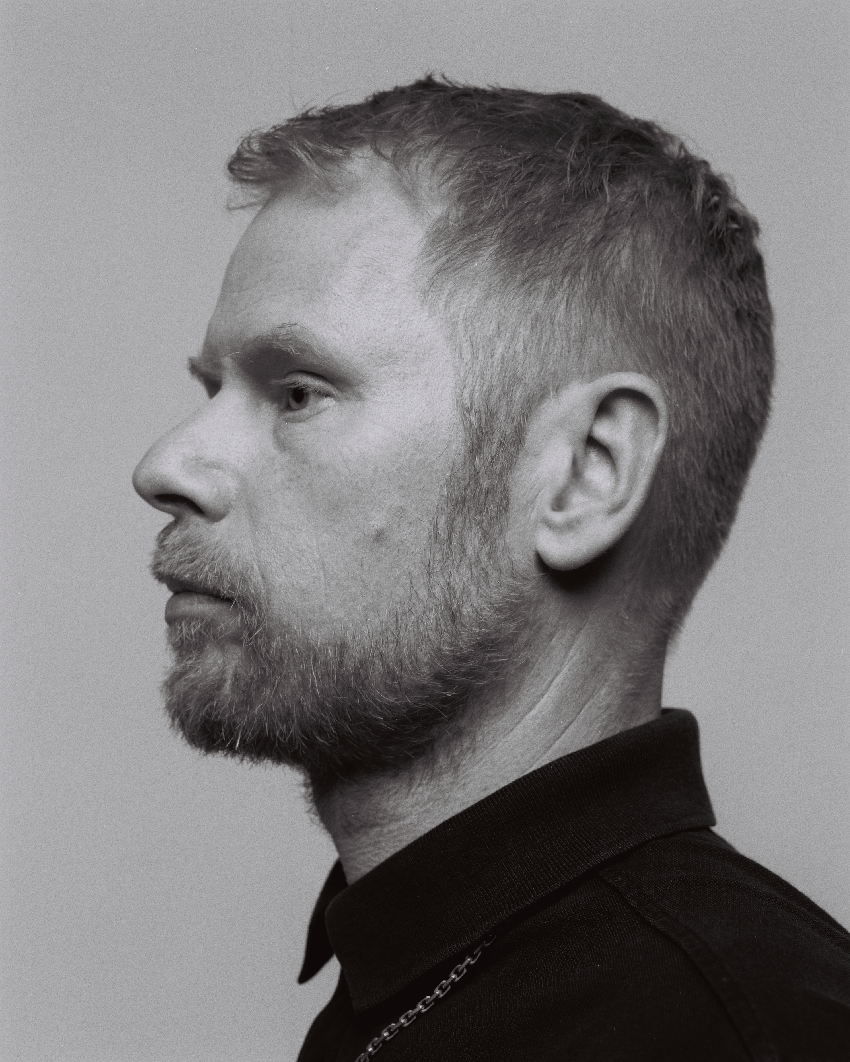
Lady Gaga's "Poker Face" became the best-performing single of 2009, while Peter Fox's Stadtaffe became the best-performing album of the year.

This is a list of the German Media Control Top100 Singles & Top100 Albums Charts number-ones of 2009.

== Number-one hits by week ==
Key
†	Indicates best-performing single and album of 2009

Issue date	Single	Artist	Ref.	Album	Artist	Ref.
2 January	"Hot n Cold"	Katy Perry		Was muss muss - Best of	Herbert Grönemeyer	
9 January	"Hot n Cold"	Katy Perry		Was muss muss - Best of	Herbert Grönemeyer	
16 January	"Hot n Cold"	Katy Perry		Was muss muss - Best of	Herbert Grönemeyer	
23 January	"Hot n Cold"	Katy Perry		Adoro	Adoro	
30 January	"Broken Strings"	James Morrison featuring Nelly Furtado		Adoro	Adoro	
6 February	"Broken Strings"	James Morrison featuring Nelly Furtado		Working on a Dream	Bruce Springsteen	
13 February	"Broken Strings"	James Morrison featuring Nelly Furtado		Working on a Dream	Bruce Springsteen	
20 February	"Broken Strings"	James Morrison featuring Nelly Furtado		Stadtaffe †	Peter Fox	
27 February	"Broken Strings"	James Morrison featuring Nelly Furtado		Give Me Fire	Mando Diao	
6 March	"Irgendwas bleibt"	Silbermond		Stadtaffe †	Peter Fox	
13 March	"Poker Face" †	Lady Gaga		No Line on the Horizon	U2	
20 March	"Poker Face" †	Lady Gaga		Stadtaffe †	Peter Fox	
27 March	"Poker Face" †	Lady Gaga		Stadtaffe †	Peter Fox	
3 April	"Poker Face" †	Lady Gaga		Nichts Passiert	Silbermond	
10 April	"Poker Face" †	Lady Gaga		Nichts Passiert	Silbermond	
17 April	"Poker Face" †	Lady Gaga		Zwischen Himmel & Erde	Andrea Berg	
24 April	"Poker Face" †	Lady Gaga		Nichts Passiert	Silbermond	
1 May	"Poker Face" †	Lady Gaga		Sounds of the Universe	Depeche Mode	
8 May	"Poker Face" †	Lady Gaga		Sounds of the Universe	Depeche Mode	
15 May	"Poker Face" †	Lady Gaga		Sounds of the Universe	Depeche Mode	
22 May	"Poker Face" †	Lady Gaga		Sounds of the Universe	Depeche Mode	
29 May	"Anything but Love"	Daniel Schuhmacher		21st Century Breakdown	Green Day	
5 June	"Anything but Love"	Daniel Schuhmacher		MTV Unplugged in New York	Sportfreunde Stiller	
12 June	"Anything but Love"	Daniel Schuhmacher		MTV Unplugged in New York	Sportfreunde Stiller	
19 June	"Poker Face" †	Lady Gaga		Battle for the Sun	Placebo	
26 June	"Poker Face" †	Lady Gaga		Foot of the Mountain	a-ha	
3 July	"Jungle Drum"	Emilíana Torrini		The Album	Daniel Schuhmacher	
10 July	"Jungle Drum"	Emilíana Torrini		King of Pop	Michael Jackson	
17 July	"Jungle Drum"	Emilíana Torrini		King of Pop	Michael Jackson	
24 July	"Jungle Drum"	Emilíana Torrini		King of Pop	Michael Jackson	
31 July	"Jungle Drum"	Emilíana Torrini		King of Pop	Michael Jackson	
7 August	"Jungle Drum"	Emilíana Torrini		King of Pop	Michael Jackson	
14 August	"Jungle Drum"	Emilíana Torrini		King of Pop	Michael Jackson	
21 August	"Jungle Drum"	Emilíana Torrini		King of Pop	Michael Jackson	
28 August	"If a Song Could Get Me You"	Marit Larsen		Wir Kinder vom Bahnhof Soul	Jan Delay	
4 September	"If a Song Could Get Me You"	Marit Larsen		Wir Kinder vom Bahnhof Soul	Jan Delay	
11 September	"If a Song Could Get Me You"	Marit Larsen		I Look to You	Whitney Houston	
18 September	"If a Song Could Get Me You"	Marit Larsen		Wünsche	Pur	
25 September	"If a Song Could Get Me You"	Marit Larsen		The Resistance	Muse	
2 October	"Pussy"	Rammstein		Celebration	Madonna	
9 October	"Sexy Bitch"	David Guetta featuring Akon		Celebration	Madonna	
16 October	"Paparazzi"	Lady Gaga		Humanoid	Tokio Hotel	
23 October	"Bodies"	Robbie Williams		Alles kann besser werden	Xavier Naidoo	
30 October	"Bodies"	Robbie Williams		Liebe ist für alle da	Rammstein	
6 November	"Bodies"	Robbie Williams		Liebe ist für alle da	Rammstein	
13 November	"Pflaster"	Ich + Ich		The Circle	Bon Jovi	
20 November	"Bodies"	Robbie Williams		Reality Killed the Video Star	Robbie Williams	
27 November	"Pflaster"	Ich + Ich		Gute Reise	Ich + Ich	
4 December	"Pflaster"	Ich + Ich		Gute Reise	Ich + Ich	
11 December	"Meet Me Halfway"	The Black Eyed Peas		Gute Reise	Ich + Ich	
18 December	"I Will Love You Monday (365)"	Aura Dione		Gute Reise	Ich + Ich	
25 December	"I Like"	Keri Hilson		Gute Reise	Ich + Ich	

== See also ==
- List of number-one hits (Germany)
- List of German airplay number-one songs
