= Ding (song) =

Single by Seeed

from the album Next!
- Released: February 10, 2006
- Genre: Dancehall; hip hop; hip house; alternative dance; synthpop
- Length: 3:25
- Label: Warner Bros.
- Songwriter(s): Pierre Baigorry; Demba Nabé; Frank Dellé
- Producer(s): DJ Luke

Seeed singles chronology
"Schwinger" (2005)	"Ding" (2006)	"Molotov/Wonderful Life" (2011)

"Ding" (German for thing) is a song released in 2006 by German reggae/dancehall band Seeed. It was the third and last single of the third album Next! and reached No. 5 in the German Single Charts.

== Charts ==
=== Weekly charts ===
Chart (2006)	Peak position
Austria (Ö3 Austria Top 40)	4
Germany (GfK)	5
Switzerland (Schweizer Hitparade)	27

=== Year-end charts ===
Chart (2006)	Position
Austria (Ö3 Austria Top 40)	20
Germany (Official German Charts)	22
