= Aufstehn! =

Single by Seeed featuring CeeLo Green

from the album Next!
- Released: 2005
- Length: 3:51
- Label: Warner Bros.
- Songwriter(s): Thomas Callaway; Pierre Baigorry; Frank A. Dellé; Pierre Krajewski
- Producer(s): DJ Illvibe

Seeed singles chronology
"Release" (2004)	"Aufstehn!" (2005)	"Schwinger" (2005)

CeeLo Green singles chronology
"Happy Hour" (2005)	"Aufstehn!" (2005)	"Politics" (2005)

"Aufstehn!" (German for Get Up) is a song released in 2005 by German band Seeed together with American singer Cee Lo Green. It was the first single of the third album Next! and reached No. 5 in the German Single Charts.

== Music video ==
The video shows the three singers of Seeed in a boat driving to a concert where the other Seeed members are waiting. The video shows CeeLo Green too. He is standing in front of a house.

== Composition ==
The song contains lyrics in German and English. Most of the lyrics are in German, however, the intro, the second half of the second verse and the third verse (which is sung by CeeLo Green) are in English. There is also a version which is all English called Rise & Shine.

== Charts ==
Chart (2005)	Peak position
Austria (Ö3 Austria Top 40)	14
Germany (GfK)	5
Switzerland (Schweizer Hitparade)	28
