= Inéz (singer) =

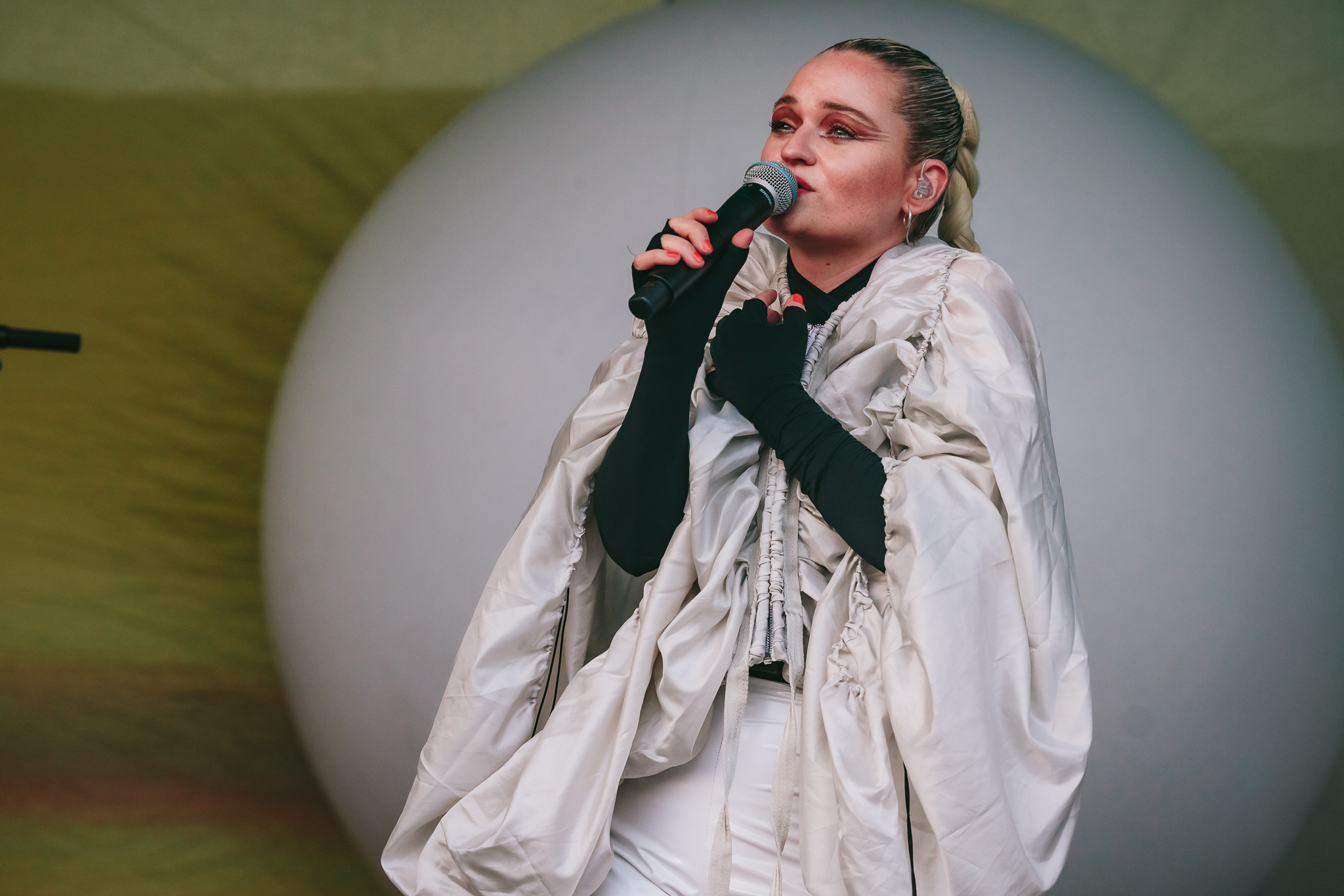
- Inéz (2022)

Background information
- Born: Inéz Schaefer; June 15, 1990 (age 36); Saarbrücken, Germany
- Origin: Germany
- Genres: electronic, pop
- Occupations: Singer, songwriter, multi-instrumentalist
- Instruments: vocals, piano, synthesizer
- Years active: 2017 – present

Inéz Kappenstein (born Inéz Schaefer, 15 June 1990), better known by her mononymous stage name Inéz, is a German singer, songwriter, and instrumentalist. She is known for her collaborations with artists such as Solomun, John Summit, and Peter Fox and as the vocalist and keyboardist of the avant-pop duo ÄTNA, formed in 2017 with drummer Demian Kappenstein. The duo has received international recognition for their innovative blend of electronic music and art pop, including winning the Anchor Award in 2020.

== Life and education ==
Inéz was born in Saarbrücken, Germany. She studied jazz vocals at the Hochschule für Musik Carl Maria von Weber in Dresden.

Inéz is married to her ÄTNA bandmate Demian Kappenstein.

== Career ==
=== ÄTNA ===
While studying in Dresden, Inéz met percussionist Demian Kappenstein. Together, they formed the avant-pop duo ÄTNA in 2017. Known for their intense live performances and genre-defying sound, they have performed at international festivals such as Eurosonic Noorderslag, SXSW, and Amsterdam Dance Event.

=== Collaborations and solo work ===
Inéz has collaborated with a number of notable German and international artists. She featured on John Summit's 2025 single "light years" and Solomun’s singles "Tuk Tuk" and "Prospect". In 2022, she was featured on Peter Fox’s comeback single "Zukunft Pink", which debuted at number one on the German singles chart.

She has also contributed vocals to projects by Marteria and Seeed, and composed for theatre and film.

In 2023, she performed in the stage adaptation of Benjamin von Stuckrad-Barre's novel Noch wach? at the Thalia Theater in Hamburg.

Inéz co-wrote DJ Koze’s 2025 track “Tu Dime Cuando,” featuring Sofia Kourtesis and Ada.

She is an ambassador for the Keychange initiative, advocating for gender equality in the music industry.

== Discography ==
=== With ÄTNA ===
- Made by Desire (2020)
- Push Life (2022)
- Lucky Dancer (2024)

=== Selected featured singles ===
- "Tuk Tuk" – Solomun feat. Inéz (2021)
- "Prospect" – Solomun feat. Inéz (2021)
- "Love, Peace & Happiness" – Marteria feat. Inéz & Yasha (2021)
- "Zukunft Pink" – Peter Fox feat. Inéz (2022)
- "light years" - John Summit feat. Inéz (2025)
- "Chiggy Chiggy" - Malugi feat. Inéz (2025)
- "crystallized" - John Summit feat. Inéz (2025)
- "Fade" - Sub Focus feat. Inéz (2025)
- "M.I.A." - Said The Sky (Inéz, uncredited) (2026)
- "Eyes Cut Deeper" - Subtronics feat. Inéz (2026)

== Awards ==
- 1Live Krone
  - 2022 – Best Song: "Zukunft Pink" (with Peter Fox)
- Anchor Award – Winner (2020, with ÄTNA)
