= Zukunft Pink =

2022 single by Peter Fox

Single by Peter Fox featuring Inéz

from the album Love Songs
- Language: German
- Released: 20 October 2022
- Genre: Dancehall; Amapiano
- Length: 3:50
- Label: Warner
- Songwriters: Pierre Baigorry; David Conen; Torsten Schroth; Vincent von Schlippenbach
- Producers: Peter Fox; The Krauts

Peter Fox singles chronology
"Flex Pon You" (2019)	"Zukunft Pink" (2022)

Inéz singles chronology
"Astray" (2017)	"Zukunft Pink" (2022)

Music video
- "Zukunft Pink" on YouTube

"Zukunft Pink" (transl. "Future Pink") is a song by German musician Peter Fox featuring singer Inéz. It was released on 20 October 2022, through Warner, as the lead single from Fox's second studio album Love Songs.

"Zukunft Pink" debuted at number one in Germany, becoming Fox's and Inéz's first song to top the chart.

== Background and composition ==
In August 2009, Fox embarked on a farewell tour and announced that he is not going to release another solo album. Instead, he continued to be part of the band Seeed. The musician would not appear solo on a song until 2019. "Zukunft Pink" serves as the first solo release of the musician in 14 years, as well as his first musical output overall in two years.

The song was described as a "euphoric anthem" against several crises going on in the world. The Dancehall-track was widely seen as a positive future prospect, especially regarding the COVID-19 pandemic and the Russian invasion of Ukraine.

== Music video ==
The music video for "Zukunft Pink", directed by Jakob Grunert, was released on 20 October 2022. Fox once more picks up on his perception of his home town Berlin, along with its "soulless" backyards and high-rises. In contrast, the video features shots of euphoric people dancing on top of a floating skyscraper.

== Charts ==
=== Weekly charts ===
Weekly chart performance for "Zukunft Pink"
Chart (2022)	Peak position
Austria (Ö3 Austria Top 40)	3
Germany (GfK)	1
Switzerland (Schweizer Hitparade)	21

=== Year-end charts ===
2022 year-end chart performance for "Zukunft Pink"
Chart (2022)	Position
Germany (Official German Charts)	53

2023 year-end chart performance for "Zukunft Pink"
Chart (2023)	Position
Austria (Ö3 Austria Top 40)	40
Germany (Official German Charts)	6

== Certifications ==
Certifications for "Zukunft Pink"
Region	Certification	Certified units/sales
Austria (IFPI Austria)	Platinum	30,000^{‡}
Germany (BVMI)	3× Gold	900,000^{‡}
Switzerland (IFPI Switzerland)	Platinum	20,000^{‡}
^{‡} Sales+streaming figures based on certification alone.
