= Jadu (artist) =

German singer, musician and songwriter

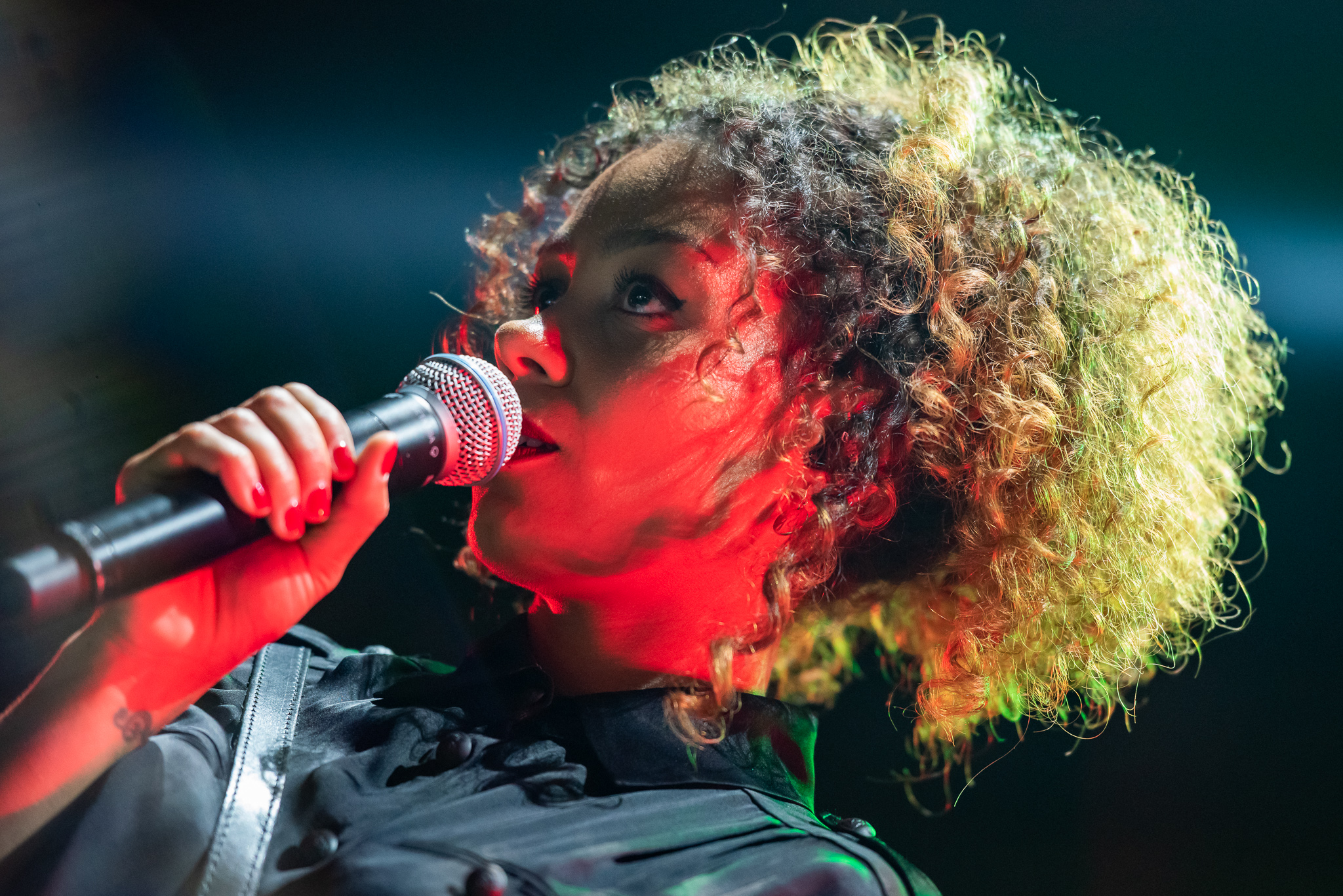
- Jadu at Rock im Park 2019

Background information
- Also known as: Jadula Laciny
- Born: Jadula Freydank; August 26, 1988 (age 37); Bissendorf, Lower Saxony, Germany
- Website: jadu.berlin

Jadu (full name Jadula Laciny, name at birth Jadula Freydank) is a German singer, musician and songwriter living in Berlin.

== Biography ==
Jadu was born in August 26, 1988 in Bissendorf and grew up in Bad Essen. She moved to Osnabrück in 2007 and in 2013 she met Marten Laciny, better known as the rapper Marteria (and his alter ego Marsimoto), whom she married in 2015 and was married to for five years.

Jadu is a singer, drummer and guitarist. In 2013 she toured with the rapper Chefket as his guitarist, playing e.g. at the Splash Festival. In 2017 she wrote the title track of Die Toten Hosen's album Laune der Natur, together with her husband and with Campino, singer in Die Toten Hosen.

In 2019 she released the album Nachricht vom Feind which was noticed for its strong symbolism. Jadu sometimes describes her musical style as Darkpop, but more typically as "Military Dream Pop", and she has been compared to a female version of Rammstein due to the symbolism. The debut album contains musical elements from pop as well as from Neue Deutsche Härte and classical music. The German lyrics are provocative and full of military language and BDSM references. The theme of her songs is the deep and dark aspects of love. For example, one of her songs describes the relationship between Eva Braun and Adolf Hitler.

In 2020 she was the support act on Lindemann's European tour.

== Discography ==
Albums

- 2019: Nachricht vom Feind (Album, Deserteur/Groove Attack)
- 2022 Modus Operandi

Singles

- 2017: Treibjagd (Staatsakt / Caroline / Universal Music)
- 2018: Uniform (Deserteur)
- 2019: Todesstreifen (Deserteur)
- 2019: Friedliche Armee (feat. Nessi; Deserteur)
- 2019: Der Feind/Frühling in Schwerin/Die Erlösung (Jadu & das Metropolis Orchester Berlin) (Deserteur)
- 2020: Auf drei
- 2021: Der goldene Schluss
- 2021 Stockholm

Guest artist/Songwriter

- 2015: Illegalize It and Usain Bolt (guitar) on Ring der Nebelungen by Marsimoto
- 2017: El Presidente (lyrics) and Blue Marlin (backing vocals) on Roswell by Marteria
- 2017: Laune der Natur (songwriter) on Laune der Natur by Die Toten Hosen

== Music videos ==
- 2017: "Treibjagd" on YouTube
- 2018: "Uniform" on YouTube
- 2018: "Friedliche Armee (feat. Nessi)" on YouTube
- 2019: "Uniform (Live in Rostock)" on YouTube
- 2019: "Todesstreifen" on YouTube
- 2020: "Jadu & Metropolis Orchester Berlin - Der Feind - Frühling in Schwerin - Die Erlösung" on YouTube
- 2020: "Auf Drei" on YouTube
- 2021: "Der goldene Schluss" on YouTube
- 2021: "Stockholm" on YouTube
- 2021: "Frühling in Schwerin (Live at VTB Arena Moscow)" on YouTube
- 2022: "Gefährliche Männer" on YouTube
- 2022: "Frau von Welt" on YouTube
- 2022: "Live in Berlin 2022 - Der Feind, Frühling in Schwerin, Die Erlösung" on YouTube
- 2022: "JADU ft. DISSY - Abwärts" on YouTube

== Gallery ==
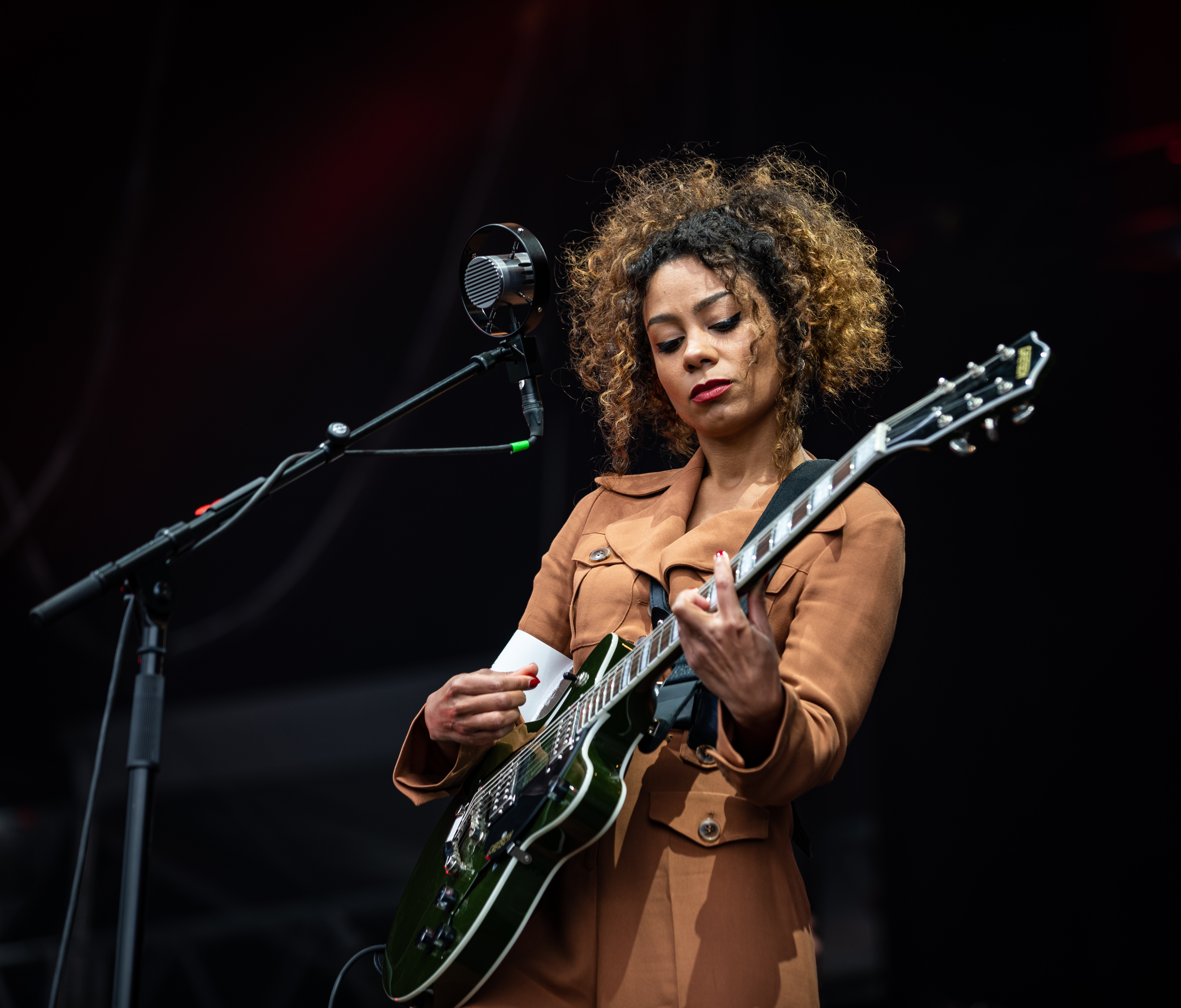
Jadu at Rock am Ring 2019
