= Haus am See =

Single by Peter Fox

from the album Stadtaffe
- Released: 17 October 2008
- Genre: Pop
- Length: 3:36
- Label: Warner Bros. Records
- Songwriter(s): Pierre Baigorry
- Producer(s): Peter Fox

Peter Fox singles chronology
"Alles neu" (2008)	"Haus am See" (2008)	"Schwarz zu blau" (2009)

Haus am See (German for House by the Lake) is a song released in 2008 by German musician Peter Fox. It was the second single of his studio album Stadtaffe and reached number eight in Germany.

== Charts ==
=== Weekly charts ===
Weekly chart performance for "Haus am See"
Chart (2008–2009)	Peak position
Austria (Ö3 Austria Top 40)	6
Belgium (Ultratop 50 Flanders)	8
Germany (GfK)	8
Netherlands (Dutch Top 40)	17
Netherlands (Single Top 100)	4
Switzerland (Schweizer Hitparade)	16

=== Year-end charts ===
2008 year-end chart performance for "Haus am See"
Chart (2008)	Position
Germany (Official German Charts)	83

2009 year-end chart performance for "Haus am See"
Chart (2009)	Position
Austria (Ö3 Austria Top 40)	19
Belgium (Ultratop Flanders)	56
Germany (Official German Charts)	17
Netherlands (Dutch Top 40)	69
Netherlands (Single Top 100)	29
Switzerland (Schweizer Hitparade)	53

== Certifications ==
Region	Certification	Certified units/sales
Austria (IFPI Austria)	Gold	15,000^{*}
Germany (BVMI)	5× Gold	750,000^{‡}
^{*} Sales figures based on certification alone.^{‡} Sales+streaming figures based on certification alone.
