= Alles neu =

Single by Peter Fox

from the album Stadtaffe
- Released: 15 August 2008
- Length: 4:18
- Label: Warner
- Songwriter(s): Peter Fox
- Producer(s): Peter Fox

Peter Fox singles chronology
"Alles neu" (2008)	"Haus am See" (2008)

"Alles neu" (German for "Everything New") is the debut single by German musician Peter Fox. Released on 15 August 2008, it appeared on his album Stadtaffe and reached number four in Germany.

== Production ==
The song heavily samples the 4th movement of Dmitri Shostakovich's 7th Symphony, and was itself sampled by English rapper Plan B on his 2012 hit single "Ill Manors". The song was furthermore used for the trailer of the 13th season of It's Always Sunny in Philadelphia.

== Music video ==
The song's music video features Fox performing the song accompanied by the Cold Steel Drummers, in suits and monkey masks, dancing women dressed in dirndls, and other peculiar sights.

== Charts ==
=== Weekly charts ===
Weekly chart performance for "Alles neu"
Chart (2008–2009)	Peak position
Austria (Ö3 Austria Top 40)	11
Germany (GfK)	4
Switzerland (Schweizer Hitparade)	49

=== Year-end charts ===
2008 year-end chart performance for "Alles neu"
Chart (2008)	Position
Austria (Ö3 Austria Top 40)	60
Germany (Official German Charts)	32

== Certifications ==
Region	Certification	Certified units/sales
Austria (IFPI Austria)	Gold	15,000^{*}
Germany (BVMI)	5× Gold	750,000^{‡}
^{*} Sales figures based on certification alone.^{‡} Sales+streaming figures based on certification alone.
