= The Sweetest Hangover =

Studio album by Miss Platnum
- Released: 4 September 2009
- Recorded: 2008–2009
- Genre: Pop; R&B; folk
- Length: 46:07
- Label: Four Music
- Producer: The Krauts; Roy; Miss Platnum

Miss Platnum chronology
Chefa (2007)	The Sweetest Hangover (2009)	Glück und Benzin (2014)

Singles from The Sweetest Hangover
- 1. "Why Did You Do It?" Released: 22 August 2008; 2. "She Moved In!" Released: 21 August 2009; 3. "Babooshka" Released: 30 October 2009

Professional ratings
Review scores
Source	Rating
CDStarts	6.5/10 stars
Laut.de	4/5 stars

The Sweetest Hangover is the third album by German musician Miss Platnum. It was released on 4 September 2009 under the label Four Music. The song "Why Did You Do It?" was already released in 2008, as a promotional single. The first single, "She Moved In!" was released on 14 August 2009 and reached #51 of the German Singles Chart.

== Track listing ==
The Sweetest Hangover – Standard edition
No.	Title	Length
1.	"Why Did You Do It?"	3:08
2.	"She Moved In!"	3:08
3.	"Bollywood Movie"	3:28
4.	"Don't Go to Strangers"	4:14
5.	"Where Did You Go, Boy?"	3:20
6.	"Drink Sister, Drink" (featuring She-Raw)	3:19
7.	"The Long Goodbye"	2:29
8.	"Babooshka"	4:20
9.	"I'm Broke"	4:13
10.	"Fakebling"	3:08
11.	"If You Were Mine"	3:47
12.	"So Beautiful"	3:50
13.	"Cumpletely Happy"	3:43
Total length:		46:07

The Sweetest Hangover – Bonus tracks
No.	Title	Length
14.	"Hit 'N' Run"	3:04
15.	"Before the Wedding"	4:12

== Charts ==
Chart (2009)	Peak position
Austrian Albums (Ö3 Austria)	69
German Albums (Offizielle Top 100)	27
Swiss Albums (Schweizer Hitparade)	72
