= Schwarz zu blau =

2009 song by Peter Fox

Single by Peter Fox

from the album Stadtaffe
- Released: 6 February 2009
- Length: 3:36
- Label: Warner
- Songwriter(s): Peter Fox
- Producer(s): Peter Fox

Peter Fox singles chronology
"Haus am See" (2008)	"Schwarz zu blau" (2009)	"Stadtaffe" (2009)

"Schwarz zu blau" (German for "Black to Blue") is a song released in 2009 by German reggae-dancehall-hip hop musician Peter Fox. It was the third single of his first studio album Stadtaffe and reached number three in Germany.

In 2009, Peter Fox, representing Berlin, won the Bundesvision Song Contest with the song, held in February that year in Potsdam.

== Charts ==
=== Weekly charts ===
Weekly chart performance for "Schwarz zu blau"
Chart (2009)	Peak position
Austria (Ö3 Austria Top 40)	17
Germany (GfK)	3
Switzerland (Schweizer Hitparade)	36

=== Year-end charts ===
2009 year-end chart performance for "Schwarz zu blau"
Chart (2009)	Position
Germany (Official German Charts)	59

== Certifications ==
Region	Certification	Certified units/sales
Germany (BVMI)	3× Gold	450,000^{‡}
^{‡} Sales+streaming figures based on certification alone.
