= Miss Platnum =

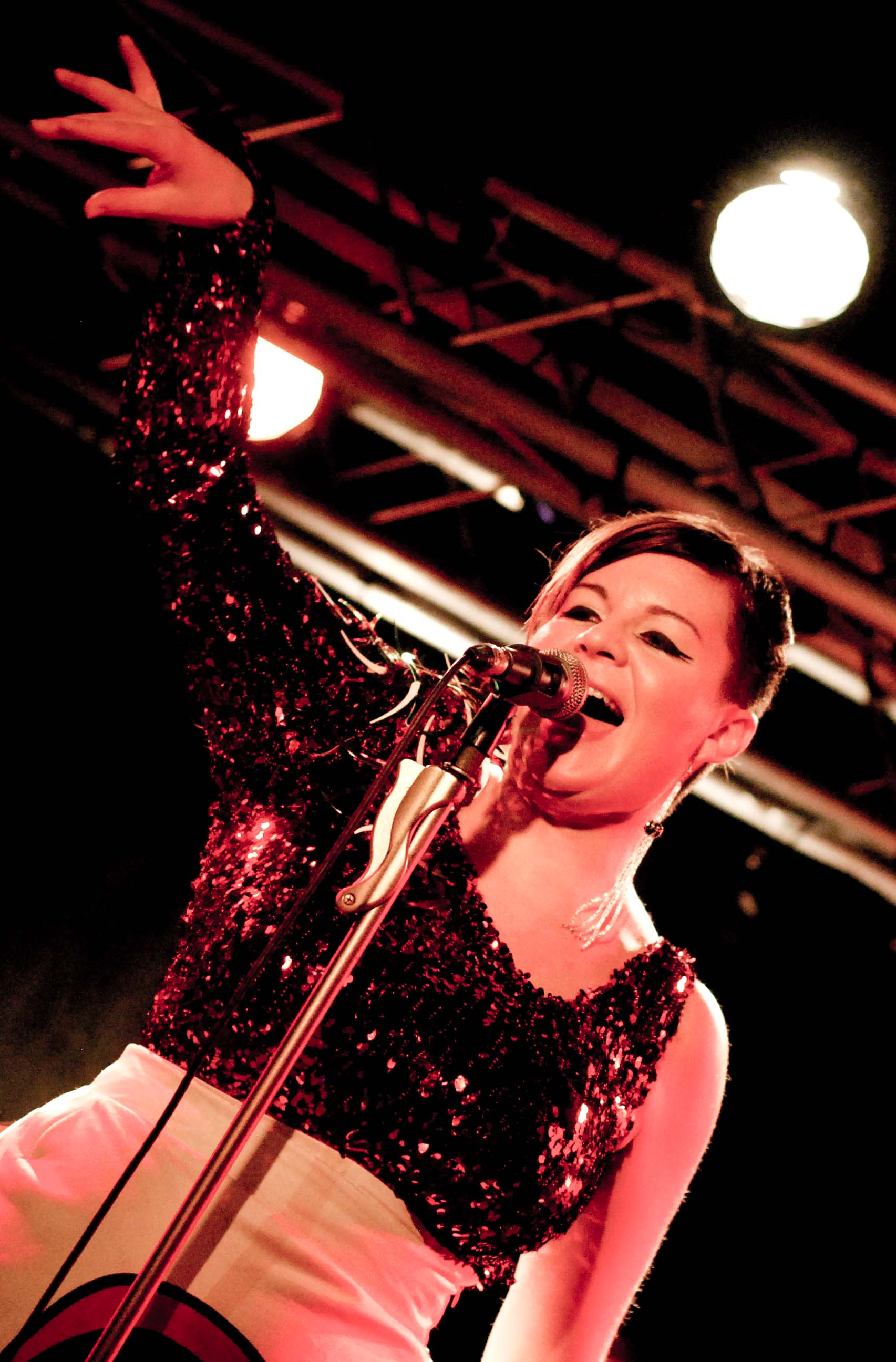

Background information
- Born: Ruth Maria Renner; 27 September 1980 (age 45); Timișoara, Romania
- Genres: Pop, Soul, R&B, Hip hop
- Occupation: Singer-songwriter
- Years active: 2004–present
- Labels: Four Music
- Website: missplatnum.com

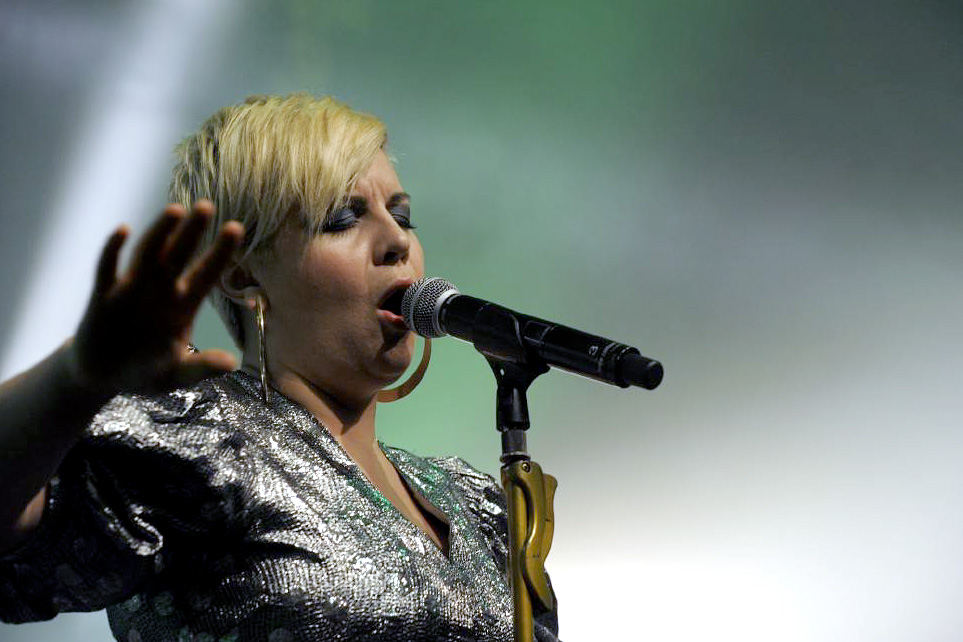
Miss Platnum, moers festival 2010

Miss Platnum (born Ruth Maria Renner; 27 September 1980), formerly known as Platnum, is a Romanian-German singer, songwriter and musician, currently signed to Virgin Records Germany.

== Biography ==
=== Early life ===
Platnum was born in Timișoara, Romania to a Romanian father with German roots and a Romanian mother. At the age of eight her family relocated to West Berlin where she went to school in Berlin-Lichterfelde. Later on she took lessons in singing with Jocelyn B. Smith and worked as a background singer for Moabeat.

=== Works ===
After her minorly successful debut album Rock Me which was released on 31 January 2005 on the Berlin-based Indie label Sonar Kollektiv, Platnum released her second album Chefa in May 2007, under her new artist name Miss Platnum. Produced by Die Krauts, it distinguished itself through a mixture of hip-hop, soul, R&B, pop and Romanian Musical elements. Its lead single, "Give Me the Food" reached the top 20 of the Romanian Singles Chart, and debuted at No. 63 on the German Singles Chart.

== Discography ==
=== Albums ===
Title	Album details	Peak chart positions		
Title	Album details	GER	AUT	SWI
Rock Me	Released: 31 January 2005; Label: Sonar Kollektiv; Formats: CD, digital download	—	—	—
Chefa	Released: 25 May 2007; Label: Four Music; Formats: CD, digital download	—	—	—
The Sweetest Hangover	Released: 4 September 2009; Label: Four Music; Formats: CD, digital download	27	69	72
Glück und Benzin	Released: 14 March 2014; Label: Four Music (Sony); Formats: CD, digital download	34	—	—
Ich war hier	Released: 2 October 2015; Label: Virgin (Universal); Formats: CD, digital download	—	—	—

=== EPs ===
- Lila Wolken (2012)
- Hüftgold Berlin (2014)

=== Singles ===
Title	Year	Peak chart positions			Album
Title	Year	GER	AUT	SWI	Album
"Give Me the Food"	2007	63	—	—	Chefa
"Come Marry Me" (featuring Peter Fox)	2007	90	—	—	Chefa
"Mercedez Benz"	2007	—	—	—	Chefa
"Why Did You Do It?"	2008	—	—	—	The Sweetest Hangover
"She Moved In!"	2009	51	72	—	The Sweetest Hangover
"Babooshka 2009"	2009	—	—	—	The Sweetest Hangover
"Lila Wolken" (with Marteria & Yasha)	2012	1	22	11	Lila Wolken – EP
"Feuer" (with Marteria & Yasha)	2012	52	—	—	Lila Wolken – EP
"99 Probleme"	2013	—	—	—	Glück & Benzin
"Letzter Tanz"	2014	—	—	—	Glück & Benzin
"Glück & Benzin" (featuring Yasha)	2014	—	—	—	Glück & Benzin
"MDCHN (Mädchen sind die besseren Jungs)"	2015	—	—	—	Ich war hier
"Kanonen"	2015	—	—	—	Ich war hier
"Blockparty" (featuring Taktloss)	2016	—	—	—	Ich war hier
