= Claudia Koreck =

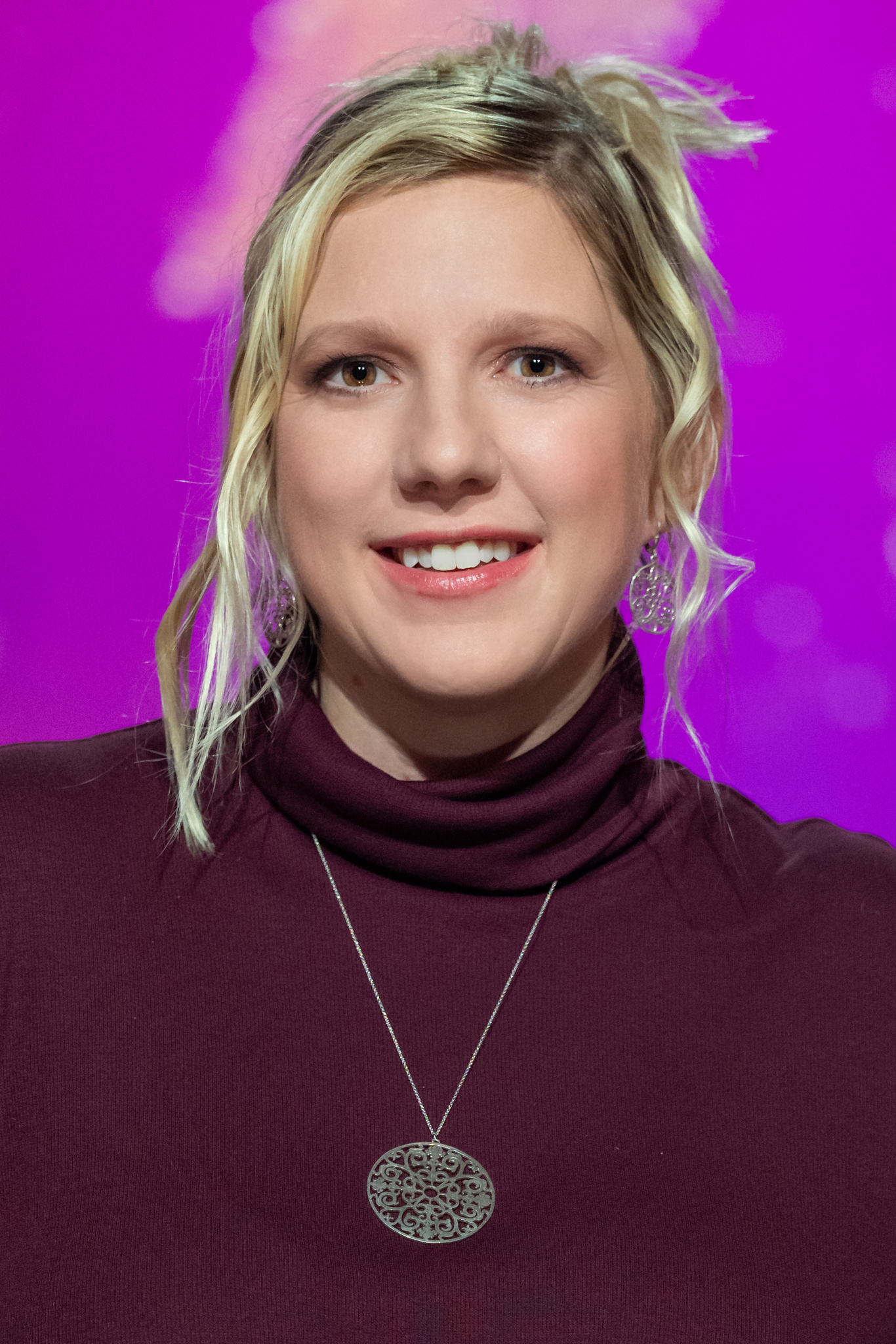
- Claudia Koreck (2024)

Background information
- Born: 28 May 1986 (age 40); Traunstein, Germany
- Occupation: Singer-songwriter
- Instrument: Guitar
- Spouse: Gunnar Graewert

Claudia Koreck (born 28 May 1986 in Traunstein) is a German singer-songwriter, performing in Bavarian dialect, German and English.

== Life and career ==
Claudia Koreck grew up first in Traunstein, later in Hufschlag (municipality Surberg). She started making music at age twelve, and in 2002 and 2003 was winning entry of the Treffen Junge Musik-Szene contest of the Berliner Festspiele. She plays the guitar. After her Abitur (German school leaving qualification) Koreck moved to Munich. She started education in modern Greek studies at Ludwig-Maximilians-Universität München, which she gave up after one semester.

In 2007 Claudia Koreck was discovered with her song "Fliang" (Bavarian: Flying) by radio channel Bayern 3. Her first album, also titled Fliang, was published 17 August 2007. It reached number one of best-selling albums in Bavaria, and reached number 15 in German music charts. She was a member of the project Menschenskinder.

Koreck in 2008 contributed the title song of Joseph Vilsmaier's remake of The Legend of Brandner Kaspar with the single "s'ewige Lem" (Bavarian: The eternal life). On 13 February 2009 she represented Bavaria in Stefan Raab's Bundesvision Song Contest with the song "I wui dass du woaßt" (Bavarian: I want you to know) and took 10th place. On the same day her second studio album Barfuaß um die Welt (Bavarian: Barefoot around the world) was published. In 2011 she played as supporting act of the Eagles at their concerts in Germany. Also in 2011 she performed the song "La-Le-Lu" for Disney Junior.

In 2013 Koreck recorded the song "Weida miteinand" (Bavarian: Onward together) with other artists from Bavaria under the umbrella of the music project Cpt. Nepomuk's Friendly Heart Choir Club.

In 2016 she performed at the jubilee of the music festival Songs an einem Sommerabend (German: Songs on a summer evening). The CD 30 Jahre Songs an einem Sommerabend (German: 30 years of Songs on a summer evening) includes her songs "Bunter Vogel" (German: Colourful bird) and "Stadt Land Fluss" (German: City country river).

In 2020 Claudia Koreck wrote the official Sternstunden [de] song 2021 together with Gunnar Graewert, "Auf bessere Zeiten" (German: To better times), for which she could gain a number of high-profile artists. Participants were: Ami Warning, Barny Murphy, BBou, Claudia Koreck, Django 3000, Ganes, Gunnar Graewert, Gudrun Mittermeier, Hans-Jürgen Buchner, Hannes Ringlstetter, Karin Rabhansl, Martin Schmitt [de], Pam Pam Ida, Roger Rekless, San2, Sebastian Horn und Stefan Dettl. The song was on number one of the GfK Entertainment charts for Bavaria for four weeks.

For the first episode of the 14th season of the TV series Der Bergdoktor (German: The mountain doctor), Koreck performed a cover version of the song "Irgendwie, irgendwo, irgendwann" (German: Anyhow, anywhere, anytime) by Nena. The episode, first aired on 14 January 2021, is titled "Aus Mut gemacht" (German: Made from courage), alluding to a passage of the lyrics. On 23 January 2021 the song reached number one in the iTunes Charts.

== Personal life ==
In September 2010 a son was born to Claudia Koreck, followed in January 2014 by a daughter. She lives with her husband, producer Gunnar Graewert, and her children at her town of birth, Traunstein.

== Members of the Claudia-Koreck-Band ==
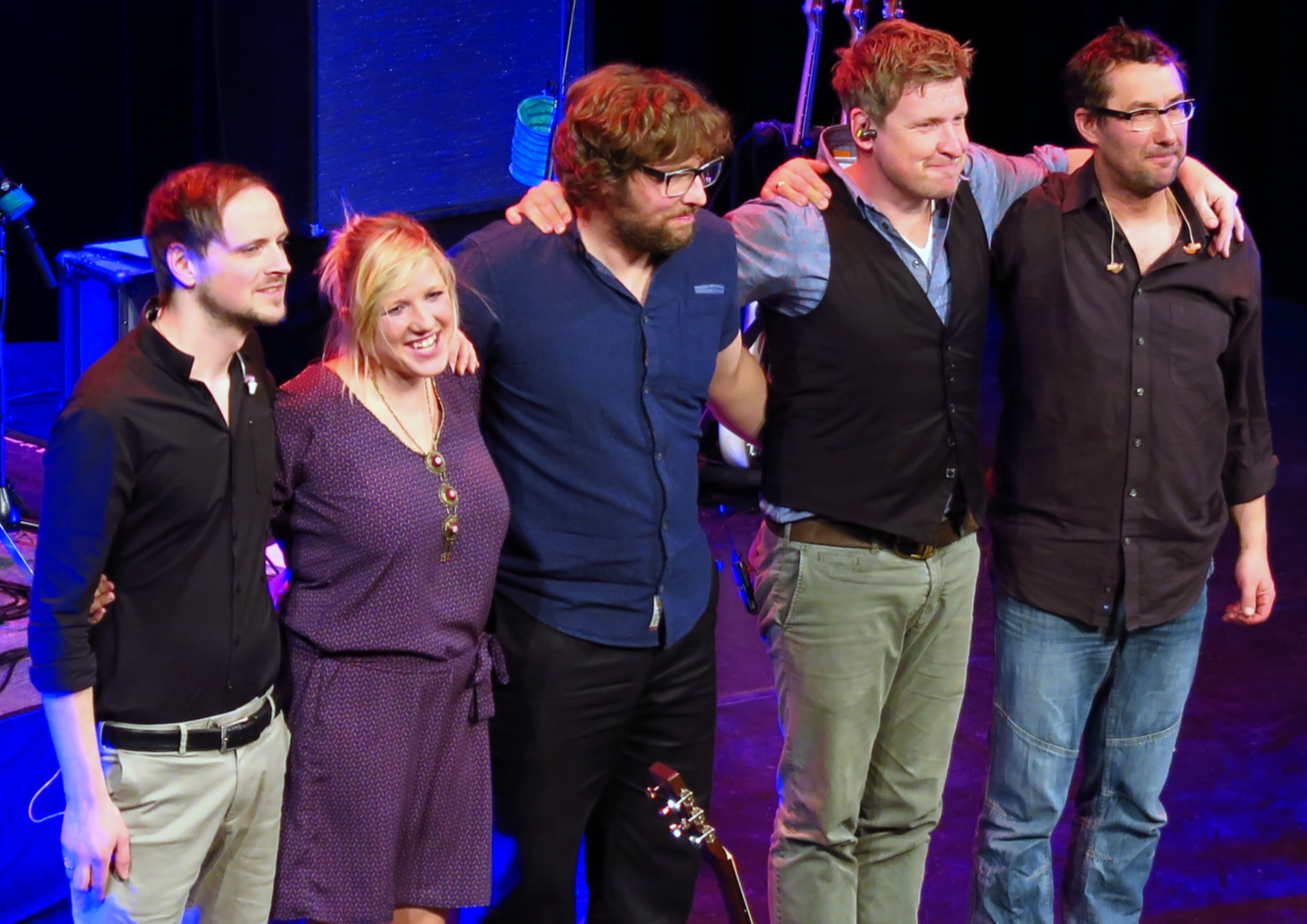
Claudia-Koreck-Band 2015

- Claudia Koreck (singer, guitar)
- Gunnar Graewert (singer, keyboard, ukulele, saxophone)
- Andreas Bauer (bass)
- Oscar Kraus (drums)
- Kilian Reischl (guitar)

== Discography ==
=== Albums ===
- 2007: Fliang (Bavarian: Flying) – number 15 in German album charts
- 2008: Fliang 2nd edition
- 2009: Barfuaß um die Welt (Bavarian: Barefoot around the world) – number 8 in German and number 51 in Austrian album charts
- 2011: menschsein (German: being human) – number 30 in German album charts
- 2011: I kon barfuass um die welt fliang und dabei menschsein (Bavarian: I can fly around the world barefoot while being human) (double CD)
- 2013: Honu Lani – number 55 in German album charts
- 2015: Stadt Land Fluss (German: City country river) – number 36 in German album charts
- 2016: Kinderplatte (German: Children's record)
- 2017: Holodeck – number 89 in German album charts
- 2018: Weihnachtsplatte (German: Christmas record)
- 2018: Kinderplatte – Weihnachten im Wald (German: Children's record – Christmas in the forest)
- 2019: Auf die Freiheit (German: To freedom)
- 2021: Perlentaucherin (German: Pearl diver) – number 18 in German album charts
- 2023: Kalender (German: Calender)
- 2025: The Loveolution Project (with Gunnar Graewert) – soundtrack to novel Sing lauter, Heidi!

=== Singles ===
- 2007: "Fliang" (Bavarian: Flying) – number 99 in German single charts
- 2007: "I mog de Dog" (Bavarian: I like the days)
- 2008: "Schuah aus" (Bavarian: Shoes off)
- 2008: "s'Ewige Lem" (Bavarian: The eternal life)
- 2010: "Beautiful" (with Donavon Frankenreiter)
- 2012: "Danzn" (Bavarian: Dancing)
- 2013: "Unter meiner Deckn" (Bavarian: Under my blanket)

=== Video album ===
- 2008: I kon fliang (Bavarian: I can fly) (live)

=== Projects with Menschenskinder ===
- 2006: Wenn der Mensch (German: When the human) (single with menschenskinder)
- 2007: Wenn Du lachst (German: When You laugh) (EP with menschenskinder)
- 2008: Neue Generation (German: New generation) (CD with menschenskinder)

== Filmography ==
- 2013: Der Bergdoktor (German: The mountain doctor) (TV series, episode: "Zwänge", German: Constraints)
- 2020: kulturschatz – kunstschaffende in bayern (German: cultural treasure – artists in Bavaria) (documentary with participation of Claudia Koreck)

== Bibliography ==
- 2025: Sing lauter, Heidi! (German: Sing louder, Heidi!) (novel, with Gunnar Graewert)

== Awards ==
- 2016: Ehrenpreis der Jugendsiedlung Hochland
- 2022: Rupertiwinkler Dialektpreis
- 2024: Bavarian Order of Merit
- 2024: Kulturpreis Bayern
