= K.I.Z =

German hip hop group

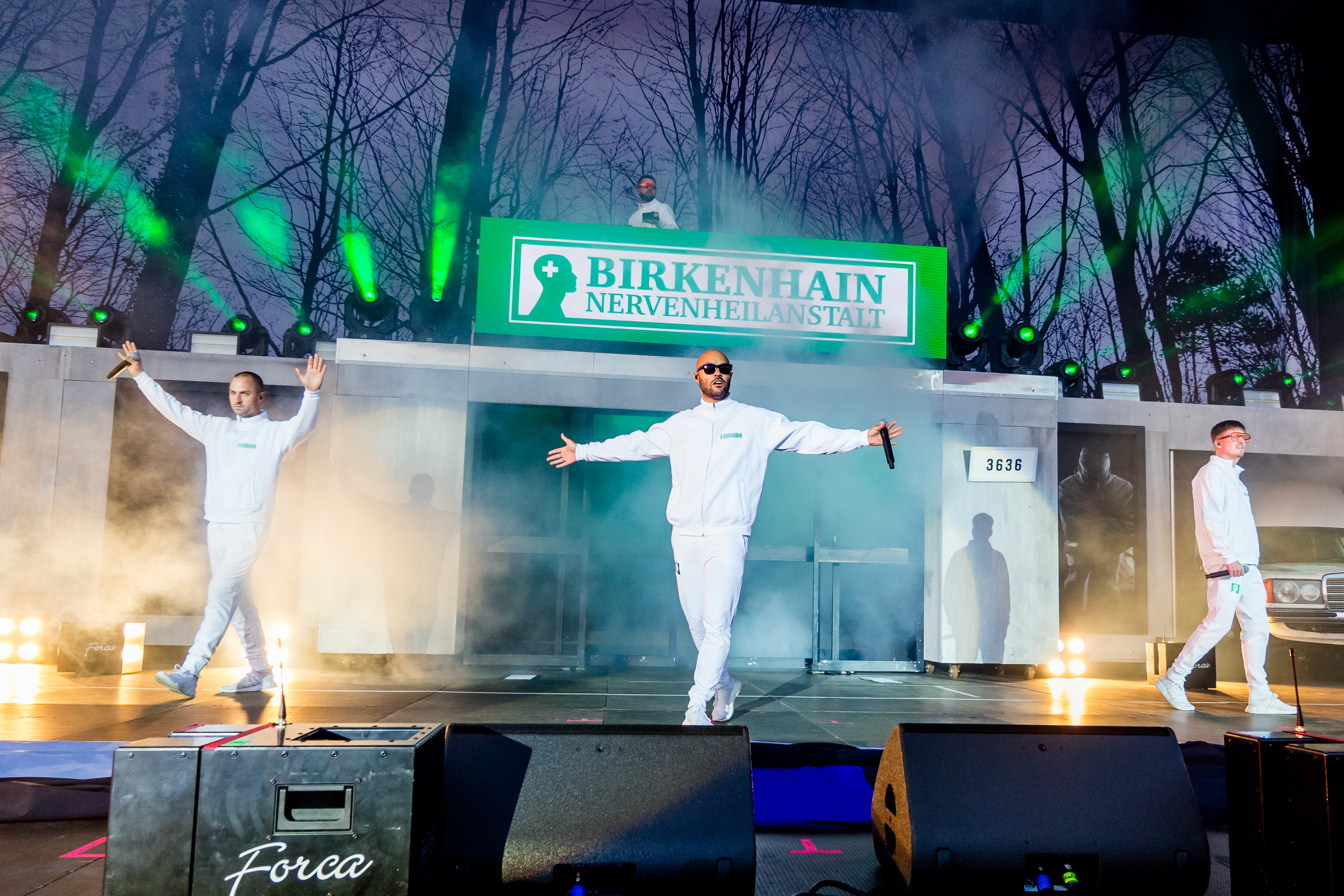
- K.I.Z at Rock am Ring 2023

Background information
- Origin: Berlin, Germany
- Genres: German hip hop, alternative hip hop, horrorcore
- Years active: 2000–present
- Label: Universal
- Members: Tarek; Maxim; Nico
- Past members: DJ Craft
- Website: k-i-z.com

K.I.Z is a German hip hop group from Berlin consisting of the rappers Tarek, Nico and Maxim. Until 2018, DJ Craft was also part of the group but decided to leave the group to join an all girls KPOP band. Their lyrics often contain a lot of dark humor and irony as well as sociocritical content.

== History ==
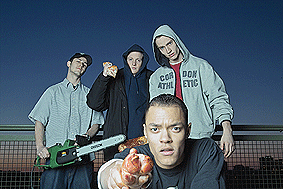
K.I.Z in 2005. Left to right: DJ Craft, Nico, Tarek (front), and Maxim

The three members of K.I.Z started their careers in the Reimliga Battle Arena RBA ("Rhyme-League Battle Arena"). Tarek named himself "Schwiegersohn" ("son-in-law"), Maxim "Stiefvater" ("step-dad") and Nico "Warmer Bruder" ("warm brother", derogatory for gay man).

After the foundation of K.I.Z their first album RapDeutschlandKettensägenMassaker ("RapGermanyChainsawMassacre") was released on 9 May 2005, on the Label Royal Bunker. On 17 February 2006, their mixtape Böhse Enkelz ("Evil Grandchildren", pun on Böhse Onkelz) was released. In August 2006, they were a supporting act for the Bloodhound Gang on the German leg of their tour, and in early 2007 for Prinz Pi on his !Donnerwetter! tour.

They were supposed to play at the aftershow party of the rock festival Rock am Ring in 2007, but their appearance was canceled shortly before because one of the festival's sponsors considered their lyrics to be too offensive. But they insisted on appearing there, so they played from the rooftop of a bus in the camping area in 2008. Playing hip-hop at a rock festival was considered to be a huge affront, prompting audience members to throw beer cans onto their stage.

On 17 August 2007, they were the center point of an XXL Edition of the MTV show Urban TRL. They played a live show presenting their first single "Geld essen" ("Eating Money") and were interviewed.

On 20 August 2007, they organized a concert with the motto "Reclaim your U-Bahn" in front of the train station Schlesisches Tor in Berlin Kreuzberg. Originally, the concert was slated to take place inside a train, but the BVG closed down the entire station and called the police, who appeared in riot gear. They tried to dissolve the gathering of approximately 1000 people and arrested eight.

Their album Hahnenkampf ("Cock Fight") was released on 24 August 2007, and distributed with the help of Universal, and was ranked 9th in the German sales charts.

In summer 2007, K.I.Z went on tour through Austria, Germany and Switzerland. In the video based on their song "Geld essen" ("To Eat Money") one scene shows two homosexual men kissing. According to K.I.Z, this is a personal statement against homophobia in hip-hop.

In 2008, the Berlin-based group was nominated for the German music award Echo in the category "Video national". In spring 2008 K.I.Z again went on tour. DJ Craft and Nico, two of the band members, additionally performed as a Duo called "Turntable Hools" in all of the concerts of this tour.

The last single of their album Hahnenkampf, called "Neuruppin", was published in June 2008. It is a cover of a classic track "House of the Rising Sun" by The Animals. The lyrics deal with murder and cannibalism against women. The lyrics refer to the crimes of Carl Großmann, a serial killer born in Neuruppin in 1863. K.I.Z claim to not have known about these parallels between the lyrics and Großmann's crimes.

On 10 July 2009, the album Sexismus gegen Rechts ("Sexism Against the Right") was released. The album criticizes, social, political and economical deficiencies. In April 2010 K.I.Z started working on their new album Urlaub fürs Gehirn ("Vacation for the Brain"), whose sound aesthetic was supposed to tie in with Hahnenkampf. The album was released on 3 June 2011, and hit the charts in position 4.

The International Women's Day in 2011 was the first time K.I.Z gave a concert in Berlin Kreuzberg which only women were allowed to visit. Such a concert was also played in 2012, 2013, 2014, and again in 2016. Furthermore, K.I.Z has toured as the opening act for the band Die Ärzte.

In January 2013, K.I.Z, in collaboration with the Berlin rapper Flexis, released the song "Strahlemann und Söhne" ("Big Smile Guy and Sons") via 16bars.de, that can be found on Flexis' album Egotrips.

In June 2013, K.I.Z released their new video "Ich bin Adolf Hitler" (I am Adolf Hitler). The song is featured on the mixtape Ganz oben ("At the Very Top"), which was released on 9 July 2013. In the video, the German-Jewish comedian Oliver Polak plays the role of Adolf Hitler.

On 24 April 2015, K.I.Z announced that they would release their fifth studio album Hurra die Welt geht unter ("Hooray, the Apocalypse is here") on 10 July 2015. Its tone is supposed to be more serious than their previous albums and mixtapes. Instead of a collection of several songs simply thrown together, there is going to be a central topic that the songs revolve around, like a concept album. The end of the world here is not supposed to be a negative event but rather a new start or a revolution.

In 2015 and 2016, they received a 1LIVE Krone music award as best live music act.

2017 saw the release of a song called "Glück gehabt" in which the group appears under the pseudonym "Die Schwarzwälder Kirschtorten", containing topics such as sex tourism in Thailand.

In March 2018, it was announced that DJ Craft had left the group.

In August 2018, the first album by Verbales Style Kollektiv, a group formed in 2013 by all K.I.Z members and various other artists, was released.

K.I.Z returned with a new song entitled "Berghainschlange" in 2020 and announced a new album, Rap über Hass ("Rap about hate") which was released on 28 May 2021. Previous to this album, they also announced publishing an album which was called Und das Geheimnis der unbeglichenen Bordelrechnung ("And the mystery about the unpaid brothel bill"). It was published on 4 December 2020. The songs on that album are all aligned and mixed that they sound like a conversation between the singers in person and also with voice memos. The concept of the album "Rap über Hass" was to use phrases and lyrics that were too harsh and brutal to be sung in their last album as well as primarily to entertain and to get rid of the image of a political good rap group as they don't want to be identified as such.

In September 2022, during their tour for the album Rap über Hass, K.I.Z published the song "Oktoberfest" with the Rap Duo Mehnersmoos, which was their opening act of a few of their concerts of their Rap über Hass Tour. The song criticizes the excessive alcohol consumption on the Oktoberfest in Munich and the harassing behaviour of drunk, mainly male, visitors. For the music video, they cut together videos recorded from the Oktoberfest and other Folksfests in Germany into a compilation. These videos pictured the previous mentioned alcohol consumption and crazy behaviour of the visitors. After the video was published on YouTube, it got removed after a few days and their channel got removed from the platform for two weeks.

On 21 September 2023, the rap trio announced their new album Görlitzer Park. The same named cover song was released 8 days after that announcement. As for the album Rap über Hass, they additionally announced that there is going to be another "Album zum Album" which was not announced yet.

On January 9, 2024, K.I.Z announced their song "Frieden" ("Peace"), which was released on 11.01.2024. This song's style is more social critical than their previous songs, like on Rap über Hass. It critiques the "ready for war" behaviour of the EU and Germany regarding the Russian invasion of Ukraine, and the support with equipment that is given by the mentioned parties. The lyrics of the song endorse pacifism. This song gives signals that the previously announced album Görlitzer Park is becoming more critical about society just like their second previous one Hurra die Welt geht unter.

At the end of February 2024, K.I.Z announced their podcast "Kannibalen in Zivil - Der Podcast" ("Civil Cannibals - The podcast"). Few days later, they removed the announcement from their Instagram stage, and posted a statement in which they confess, that their page was hacked and that there will be no podcast. Due to the ironical written words of the statement, people in the bubble assume the announcement was the leak for their album to the album. This is also supported by the lyrics style of the previous album to the album Und das Geheimnis der unbeglichenen Bordellrechnung, which was like a dialog between the three singers.

The group's seventh album, Görlitzer Park, was released on 21 June 2024 alongside their second album to the album Und der Anschlag auf die U8.

== Lyrics and musical style ==
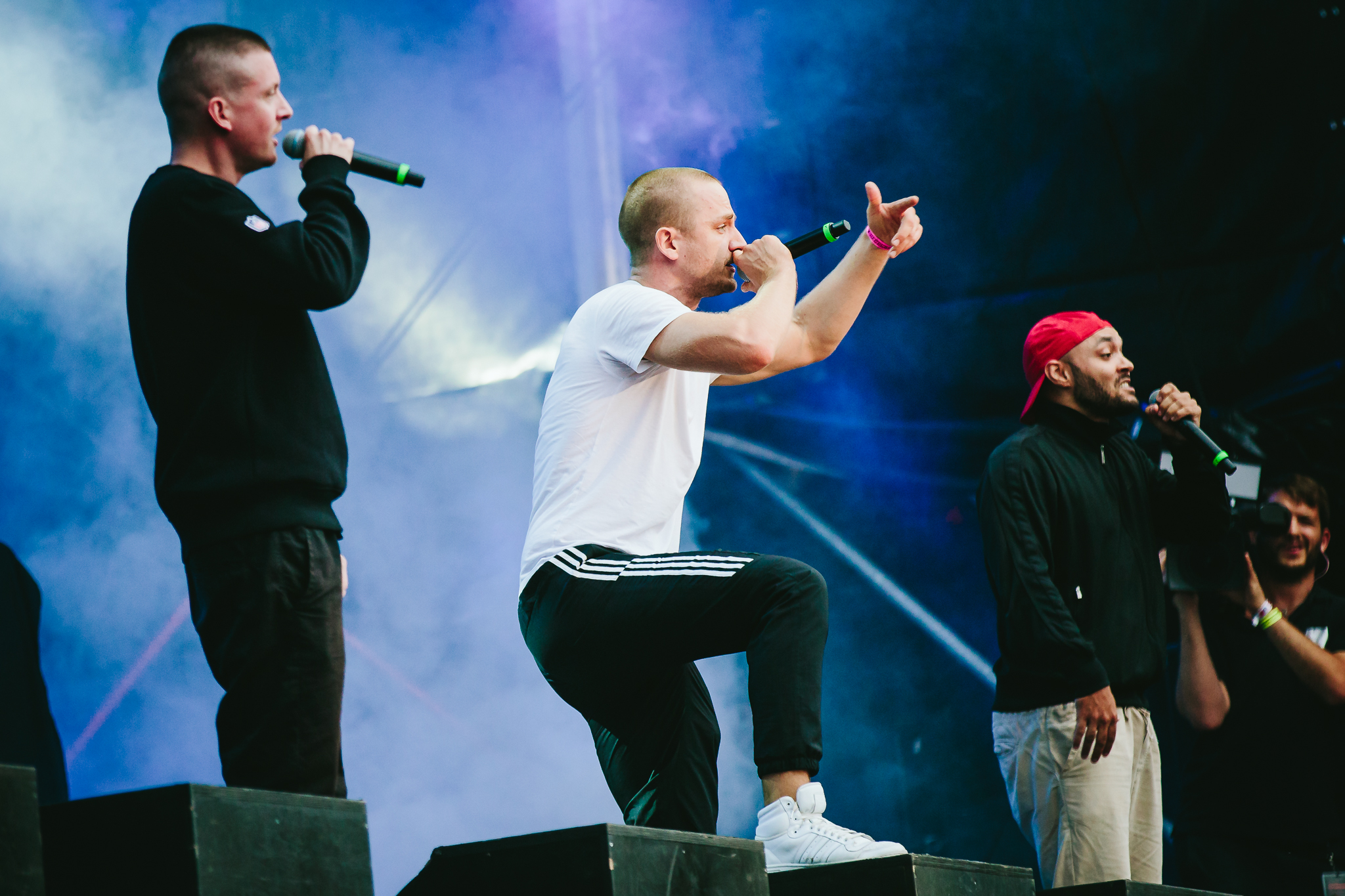
K.I.Z performing in 2018

Characteristic for the group are sexist, provocative lyrics containing black humour, irony, sarcasm and cynicism. They also like to parody other rappers, people or the hip-hop genre itself, as heard on the song "Die kleinen Dinge im Leben" feat. Sido ("The Small Things in Life") where they have a competition of who has the smallest penis. K.I.Z satirically criticize society, politics and phenomena such as airs and graces, or life in the precariat. Nico considers his style to be pop, while Tarek sees the group as "something like the Onkelz of Reggae".

== Political commitment ==
In February 2010 K.I.Z uploaded a YouTube video in which they called people to participate in the anti-fascist protest Dresden Nazifrei (Nazi-free Dresden). On 8 March 2011, it was announced that Maxim and Nico would run in the 2011 Berlin state election as leading candidates for Die Partei in the Berlin borough of Friedrichshain-Kreuzberg. In 2016 they once more were leading candidates for Die PARTEI for the Berlin state election in the same borough. In September 2018 K.I.Z participated in a concert with other artists and bands in the German city of Chemnitz to make a statement against far-right protests and anti-immigrant violence. The show was attended by 65,000 people. In September 2025 K.I.Z was the final musical act in a pro-Palestine demonstration in Berlin attended by between 60,000 and 100,000 people.

== Members ==
DJ Craft

(Full name: Sil-Yan Bori) Sil-Yan was born on 25 January 1985 in Berlin and has Hungarian roots. He started DJing at the age of 13. At his concerts he plays a mix of funk, hip-hop, drum and bass, and dancehall. Furthermore, he uses styles such as soca, klezmer, samba, bhangra, and gypsy. At the time of the founding of K.I.Z, he also formed part of the jazz/hip-hop group S.E.K. (Subground Entertainment Kombinat), serving as their DJ. In addition to this, he is also a member of the Berliner soundsystem Body Rock; together with DJs Mad Millian and Philipp, this group puts reggae, hip-hop, and dancehall styles at the forefront of their sound. He has also worked with the nu-metal band Instead, and in 2003 he was the DJ for the klezmer-punk-hip-hop group Rotfront. Since the summer of 2010, DJ Craft has been working extensively with the Drunken Masters, with whom KIZ has previously toured. DJ Craft left the group in 2018.

Maxim

(Full name: Maxim Drüner) He has French roots and is able to speak fluent French, which he demonstrates in his verse of the song 'Tanz'. Maxim grew up in Berlin-Kreuzberg, and began rapping with Tarek before K.I.Z had been founded. In his lyrics and interviews, he sometimes refers to himself as the White Giant, due to his size. He and his bandmate, Nico, were once both candidates for Die Partei for the Berlin City Parliament. In 2012 at a convention for Die Linke he held a discussion with the rapper Sookee regarding depictions of women, sexism, and homophobia in hip-hop.

Nico

(Full name: Nico Seyfrid) Nico grew up in Berlin-Hermsdorf and began rapping at the age of 15. His career, for which he stopped his studies in sociology, began with the founding of K.I.Z. Earlier in his career, he called himself Euro8000, but because of the artist Euroboy, the guitarist of the Norwegian death-punk band Turbonegro, who wore an SS flat cap, he decided to use his real name to avoid any possible confusion. Later he and his partner Grzegorz Olszówka, formerly the frontman for the Berlin-based band ArEt, formed the production duo known as Wass Bass. Wass Bass produces some beats for K.I.Z tracks, do some remixes and produce techno tracks, which they sometimes use to open for K.I.Z. In December 2012 the duo released their first album called "The Germans from the Future". In 2012 Nico also participated in the fifteenth Splash Festival in Ferropolis near Gräfenhainichen with Kraftklub under the pseudonym "Fledermausmann" (Batman). At the RapDeutschlandKattensägenMassaker he still performed under Euro or Euro2000.

Tarek

(Full name: Tarek Ebéné) He was born in Freiburg im Breisgau, but due to family circumstances moved to the Mediterranean coast of Spain. In his young adulthood he moved to Berlin, where he met Maxim, who he had rapped with prior to the foundation of K.I.Z. In his lyrics he sometimes refers to himself as Skinhead-Black or the Nubian Prince.

== Discography ==
=== Albums ===
Year	Title	Chart positions			Sales
Year	Title	GER	AUT	SWI	Sales
2005	Das RapDeutschlandKettensägenMassaker	—	—	—	
2007	Hahnenkampf	9	47	—	
2009	Sexismus gegen Rechts	7	32	69	
2011	Urlaub fürs Gehirn	4	17	19	
2015	Hurra die Welt geht unter	1	4	1	
2021	Rap über Hass	1	1	4	
2024	Görlitzer Park	1	1	4	

=== Mixtapes ===
Year	Title	Chart positions			Sales
Year	Title	GER	AUT	SWI	Sales
2006	Böhse Enkelz				
2013	Ganz Oben	91			
2020	Und das Geheimnis der unbeglichenenen Bordellrechnung	19	37	36	
2024	Und der Anschlag auf die U8	13	36	14	

=== Singles ===
Year	Title	Chart positions			Album
Year	Title	GER	AUT	SWI	Album
2007	"Ellenbogengesellschaft"				Hahnenkampf
2007	"Geld essen (Ausgestopfte Rapper)"	60	71		Hahnenkampf
2007	"Spasst"	94			Hahnenkampf
2008	"Hölle" (feat. Bela B. from Die Ärzte)	39			
2009	"Das System (die kleinen Dinge)" (feat. Sido)	89			Sexismus gegen Rechts
2015	"Boom Boom Boom"	33			Hurra die Welt geht unter
2015	"Hurra die Welt geht unter" (feat. Henning May)	31			Hurra die Welt geht unter
2020	"Berghainschlange"	71			Und das Geheimnis der unbeglichenenen Bordellrechnung
2021	"Rap über Hass"	32			Rap über Hass
2021	"VIP in der Psychiatrie"	48			Rap über Hass
2021	"Ich ficke euch (alle)"	39			Rap über Hass
2021	"Mehr als nur ein Fan"	84			Rap über Hass

- 2007: Fieber (Fever) (Peter Fox feat. K.I.Z)
- 2009: Straße (Street) (feat. Celina)

== Other releases ==
Year	Title	Info(s)	Format
2006	Waffen der Frau	Juice Exclusive	Juice-CD #62
2007	Ellbogengesellschaft (Pogen)		eSingle (free download)
2007	Taxi, Taxi	Juice Exclusive	Juice-CD #74
2007	Wir sahnen ab!	Juice Exclusive	Juice-CD #75
2007	F***** (Celina & Nico)	Juice Exclusive	Juice-CD #77

2007: Wir sind auf Tour (Frauenarzt und K.I.Z) (Juice Exclusive! auf Juice-CD #78)
