= Marteria =

German rapper (born 1982)

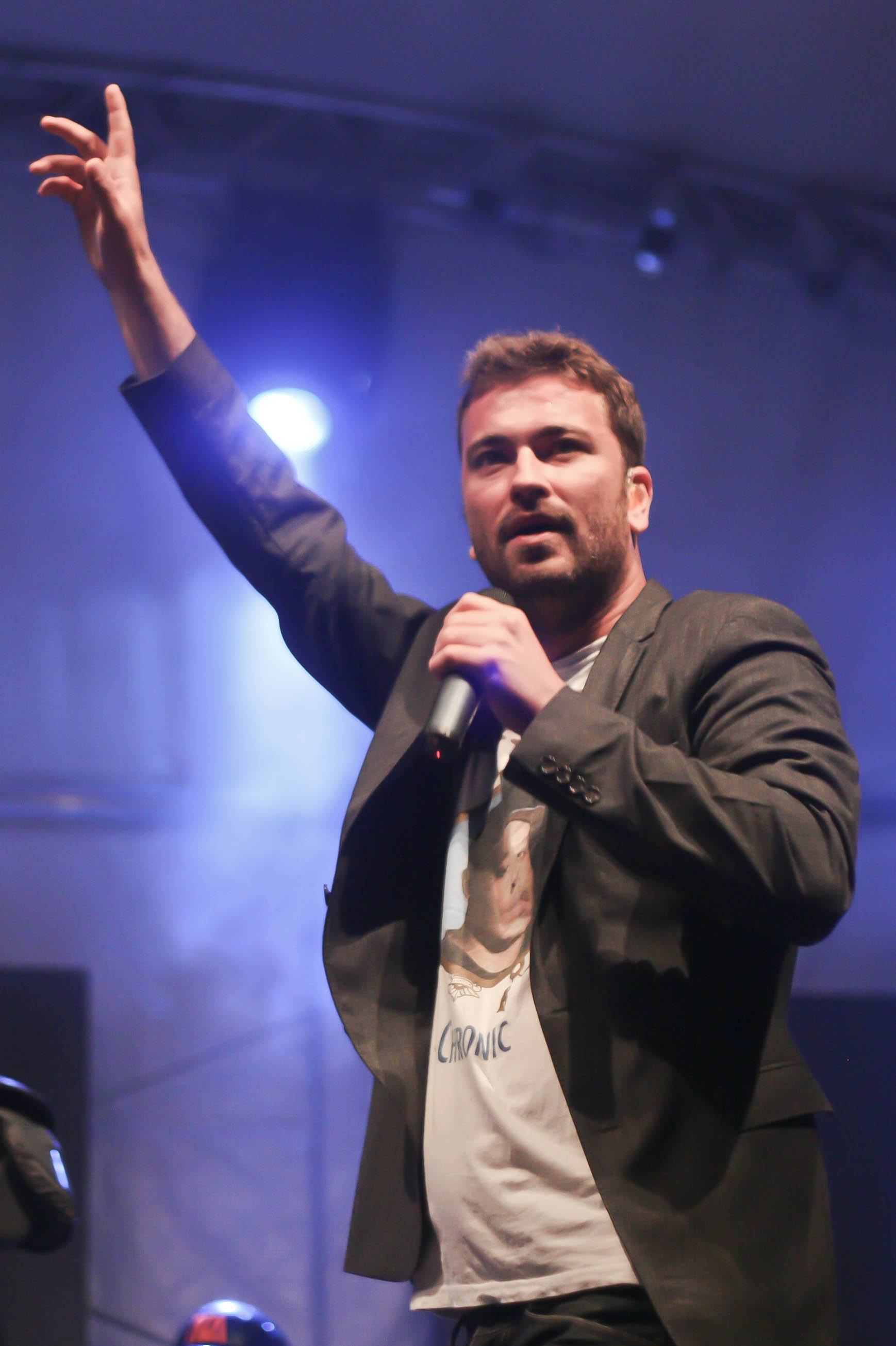
- Marteria performing in 2011

Background information
- Also known as: Marsimoto
- Born: Marten Laciny; 4 December 1982 (age 43); Rostock, East Germany
- Genres: German hip hop; pop rap; alternative hip hop; abstract hip hop
- Years active: 1998–present
- Labels: Magnum12 (2006–07); Four Music (since 2008); Green Berlin (since 2015)

Marten Laciny (born 4 December 1982), better known by his stage name Marteria, is a German rapper. He has met with success in Germany (his 2012 collaboration with Yasha and Miss Platnum, "Lila Wolken", reached Number 1 in the German music charts) and the single "Verstrahlt", featuring Yasha, was included in the video game FIFA 12.

His alternative stage name and alter ego is Marsimoto. Before his music career, he was a football player and model.

== Early life ==
Laciny was born to a teacher (mother) and a sailor (father), and spent his childhood in the district of Lichtenhagen in Rostock. A talented footballer, he played for the youth team of FC Hansa Rostock, that he still maintains a close relationship with. He played under Horst Hrubesch up in the U-17 squad of the Germany national team.

When he was discovered in 1999 during a trip to New York City by a model scout, he got model assignments all over the world. He worked for Diesel and Hugo Boss, among others, after which he discontinued his modeling and went back to Rostock to pursue his rap career.

In 2003, he moved to Berlin, where he trained as an actor at a drama school.

== Music career ==
At the age of 16, Marteria was a member of the hip hop group 'Underdog Cru', signed to the label Posin music. At 18, Marteria then signed his first solo contract with Punchline/SPV, and released his debut album. In 2002 he went as part of the Underdog Cru on a European tour with other British and German groups. A year before, in 2001, he performed as part of the Underdog Cru in the largest hip hop and reggae festival in Europe, Splash!.

Marteria's debut album, Halloziehnation, was praised by the press, and the scene magazine Juice awarded 4 1/2 of 6 stars. He then released his second album Base Ventura. These two albums he released on the indie label Magnum12, where he laid the foundations for his current career. In late 2007, he signed a contract with the music publisher Nesola. In December 2007, under his other pseudonym Marsimoto, he accompanied Jan Delay as tour support. In early 2008, he signed a label deal with Four Music (owned by Sony Music Entertainment). He also founded an own label called Green Berlin.

=== Marsimoto ===
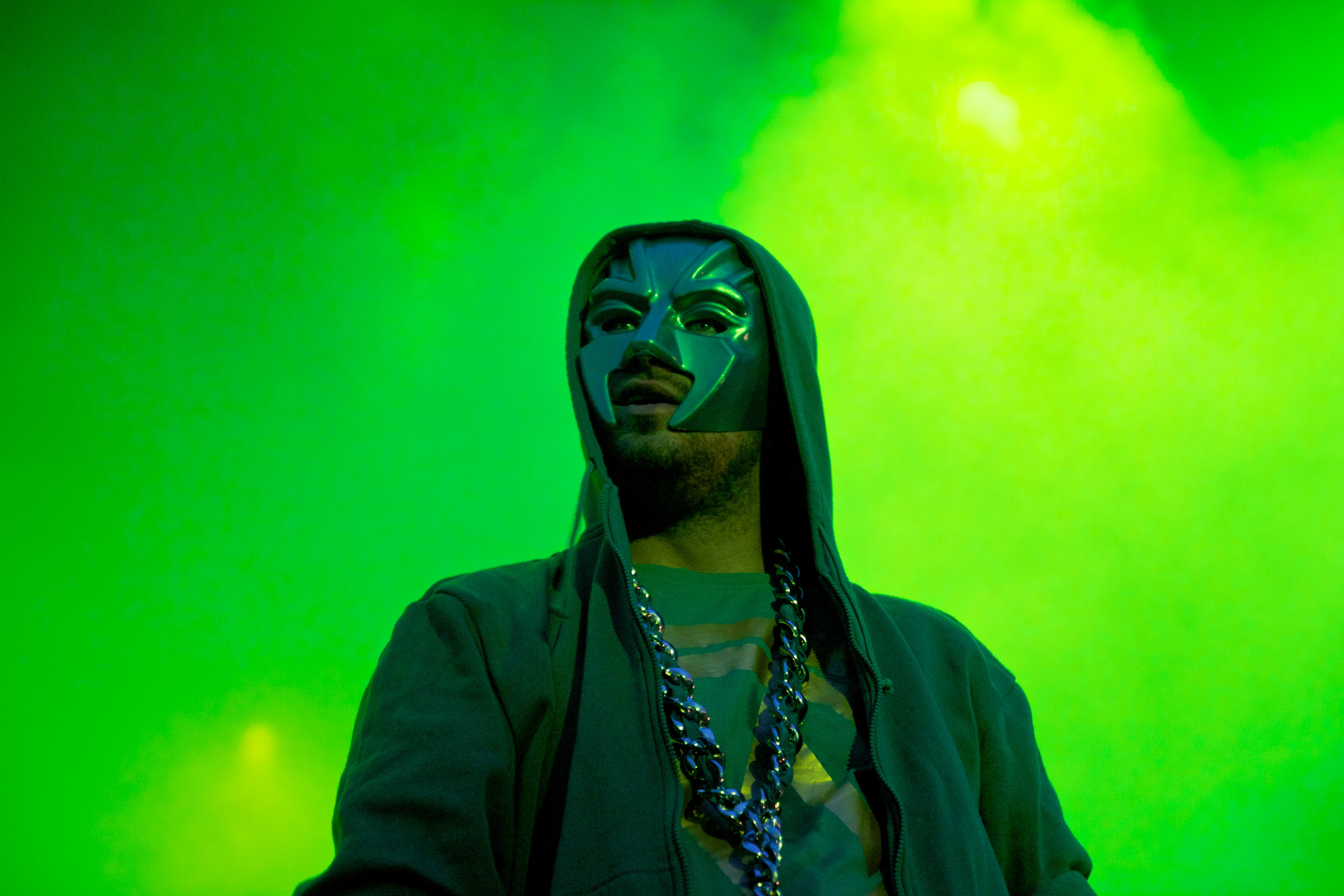
Marteria performing as Marsimoto in 2012

In addition to his stage name Marteria, he is also known under the pseudonym Marsimoto. Marsimoto originated as a tribute to Quasimoto – the alter ego of rapper Madlib – with an altered high pitched voice. The sound differs considerably from the Marteria sound, as he uses more experimental hip hop, electronic, reggae music and dubstep elements as Marsimoto. This alter ego resulted from a jam session and was later used by Marten Laciny at performances. Due to the positive response, he decided to release albums as Marsimoto. As Marsimoto, he published his solo albums Halloziehnation, Zu zweit allein, Grüner Samt, Ring der Nebelungen and Verde. A common leitmotif of all Marsimoto albums is the exaggerative consumption of cannabis.

== Personal life ==
Marteria has one son and currently lives in Berlin's Kreuzberg district.

He married the German musician Jadu in 2015. The couple separated at some point before 2021.

On 30 March 2023, Marteria was arrested after being accused of choking a woman while visiting Charlotte, North Carolina. The charges were later dropped on 18 April.

== Discography ==
=== Marteria ===
Albums

- 2007: Base Ventura
- 2010: Zum Glück in die Zukunft
- 2014: Zum Glück in die Zukunft II
- 2017: Roswell
- 2018: 1982 (with Casper)
- 2018: Live im Ostseestadion
- 2021: 5. Dimension
- 2026: Zum Glück in die Zukunft III

Singles

- 2009: Zum König geboren (feat. Son of Dave)
- 2010: Verstrahlt (feat. Yasha)
- 2010: Marteria Girl
- 2011: Sekundenschlaf (feat. Peter Fox)
- 2012: Lila Wolken (Marteria, Yasha & Miss Platnum)
- 2013: Blue Uganda (Marteria, Maeckes, Lady Slyke, Bris Jean, Abramz, Sylvester)
- 2013: Big Bang
- 2013: Bengalische Tiger
- 2013: Kids (2 Finger an den Kopf)
- 2014: OMG!
- 2017: Aliens (feat. Teutilla)
- 2017: Das Geld muss weg
- 2017: Scotty beam mich hoch
- 2018: Champion Sound (feat. Casper)
- 2018: Supernova (feat. Casper)
- 2018: Chardonnay & Purple Haze (feat. Casper)
- 2021: Niemand bringt Marten um
- 2021: Paradise Delay (feat. DJ Koze)
- 2021: Marilyn (feat. Siriusmo)
- 2021: Love, Peace & Happiness (feat. Ätna & Yasha)

Free tracks

- 2007: Hintergedanken
- 2007: Remmi Demmi (Osten Powers Remix)
- 2009: Neue Nikes
- 2010: Maradona-Shirt
- 2012: Feuer (Marteria, Yasha & Miss Platnum)

Juice exclusives

- 2002: Wer nicht wagt der nicht gewinnt (feat. Underdog Cru & DJ Lord Wax) (Juice-CD #16)
- 2002: Geschichten (feat. Pussi & Gross A) (Juice-CD #18)
- 2007: New Kids On the Block II - Flash Gordon (Juice-CD #75)
- 2007: Rapper des Monats (feat. Marsimoto) (Juice-CD #77)
- 2007: Was ihr redet (feat. Ercandize, Vega und Separate) (Juice-CD #80)
- 2008: Der Penis deiner Frau (Juice-CD #83)
- 2008: 2 Mann Armee (feat. Marsimoto) (Juice-CD #86)
- 2009: MFG (Mit Füßen getreten) (feat. King Orgasmus One) (Juice-CD #100)
- 2012: Lila Wolken (Stickles Krabbe Remix) (with Miss Platnum and Yasha) (Juice Exclusive! auf Juice-CD #113)

=== Marsimoto ===
Albums

- 2006: Halloziehnation
- 2008: Zu zweit allein
- 2012: Grüner Samt
- 2015: Ring der Nebelungen
- 2018: Verde
- 2024: KEINE INTELLIGENZ

EPs

- 2011: Green Juice EP (Juice exclusive EP)

Free tracks

- 2011: Barfuß durch den Park
- 2012: Romeo & Julia
- 2012: Wir sind Marsi (feat. Kid Simius)

Juice exclusives

- 2006: Alarmstufe Dope (Juice-CD #66)
- 2007: Rapper des Monats (feat. Marteria) (Juice-CD #77)
- 2007: Phantom der Opfer (feat. Maeckes & Plan B) (Juice-CD #78)
- 2007: Grüne Brille (Juice Remix) (Juice-CD #82)
- 2008: 2 Mann Armee (feat. Marteria) (Juice-CD #86)
- 2008: Todesliste (Juice-CD #91)
- 2012: Mir ist kalt (Juice-CD #140)
