= Seeed =

German band

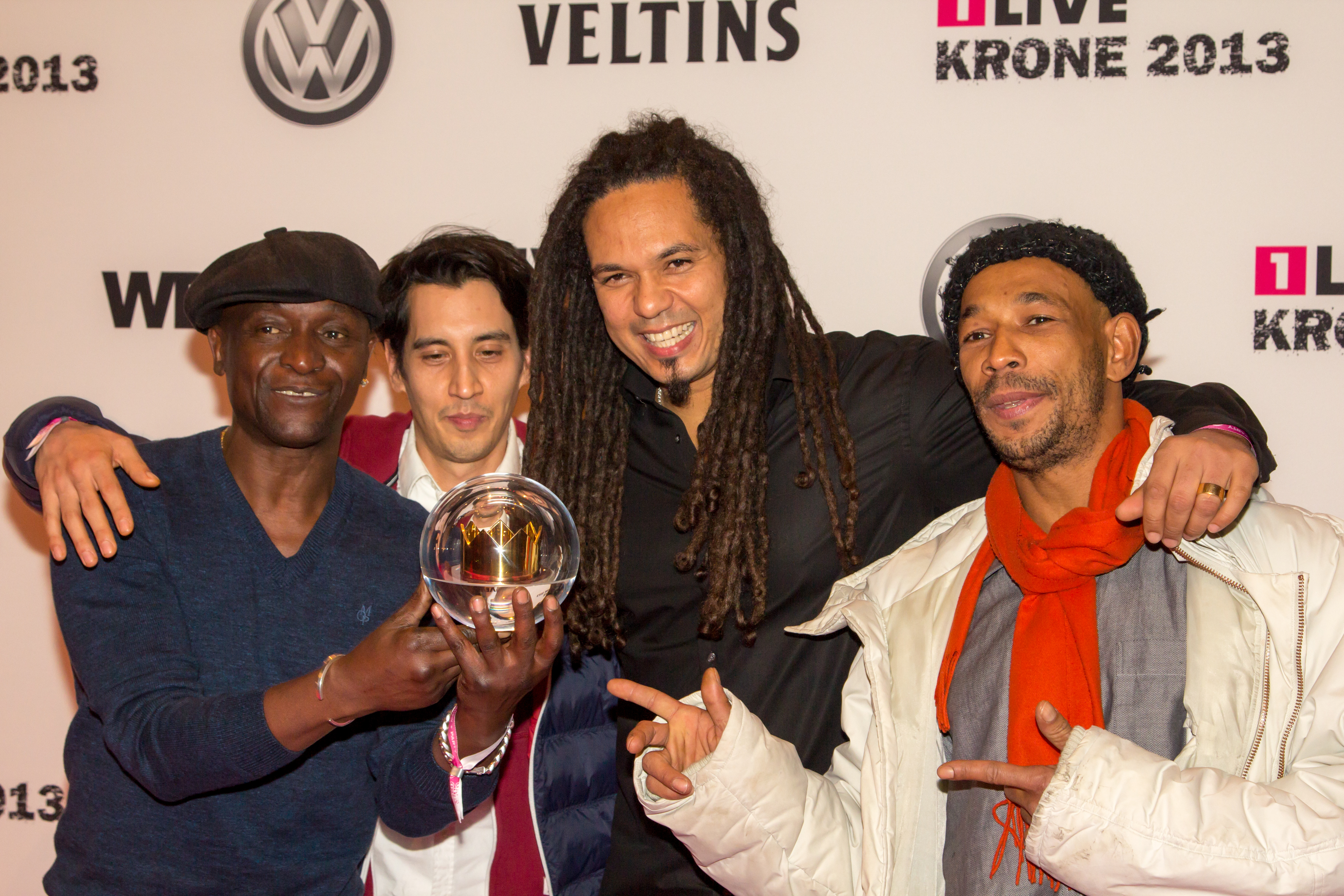
- Seeed in 2013

Background information
- Origin: Berlin, Germany
- Genres: Dancehall, reggae fusion, reggae, hip hop
- Years active: 1998–present
- Label: Downbeat Records
- Members: Alfi Trowers; Based; Moritz Delgado; Peter Fox; Frank Dellé; DJ Luke; Jerome "Tchamp" Bugnon "Dubmaster" Reibold "Rudeboy" Rudy; Tobsen Cordes
- Past members: Boundzound (deceased); DJ Illvibe
- Website: seeed.de

Seeed is a German hip hop, reggae and dancehall band based in Berlin. Founded in 1998, they have become well known in Germany and its neighboring countries.

== Musical style and lyrics ==
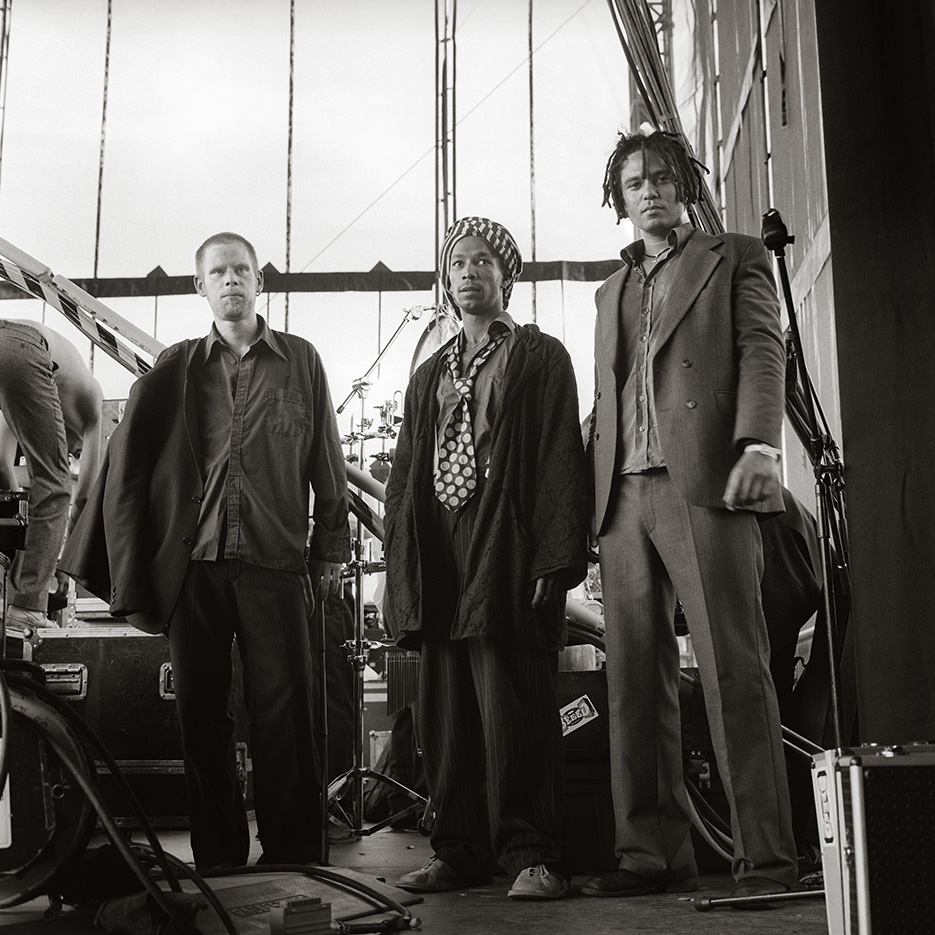
Hip Hop Open Stuttgart 2001

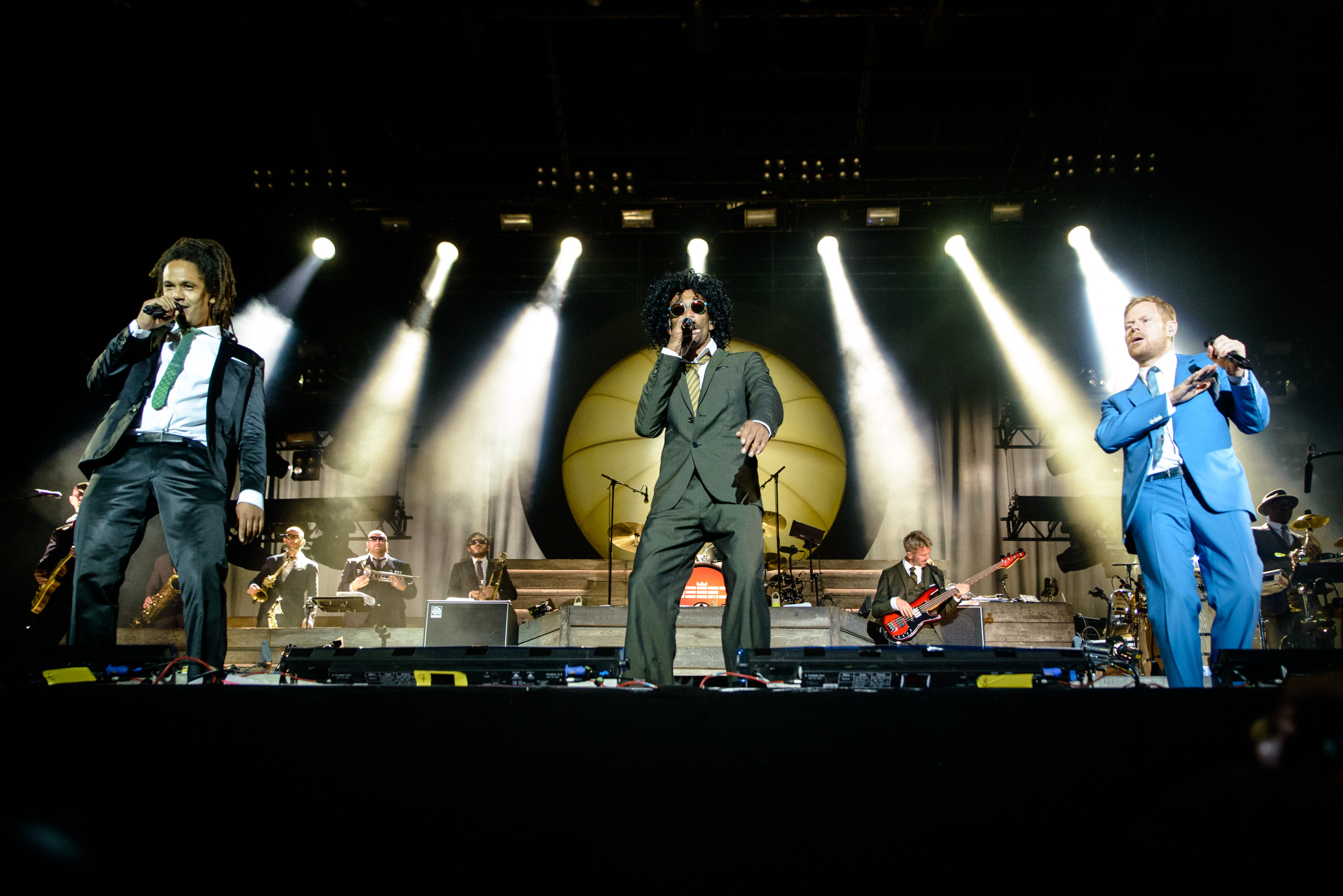
Seeed performing in 2015

Seeed consists of eleven band members, including three singers, a horn section and a DJ. Seeed is recognized for their catchy fusional mix of German hip hop, reggae and dancehall styles and their use of horns, which is unusual in contemporary popular music. They have worked with Cee-Lo Green, Anthony B, Tanya Stephens, General Degree as well as other Jamaican artists and producers. Almost all of their music releases feature a popular guest experience. Seeed's lyrics are in German, English and Patois. Their biggest hits in the German Sprachraum were "Dickes B", "Aufstehn", "Ding" and "Music Monks". Although their lyrics are in English and German, most of the songs in German were completely translated into English for the international releases of the Albums Next! and Music Monks.

== History ==
Their first hit was "Dickes B", an ode to Berlin. They won three ECHO Awards. With the international versions of Music Monks and Next!, they found broader success in Germany's neighboring countries, especially France. After their initial success with "Dickes B", in the year 2000, they released their first full-length album a few months later, in 2001: New Dubby Conquerors.

In September 2012, Seeed released their fourth studio album, Seeed, their first release in six years. In the meantime, members Peter Fox, Dellé and Demba Nabé (Boundzound) each released solo albums. The album Seeed went straight to number 1 in the German Albums Chart. It was the first time an album of Seeed achieved such a high placement.

On 31 May 2018, Demba Nabé (Boundzound) died at the age of 46.

On 18 April 2019, Seeed released their first Single "Ticket" after Nabé's death. The band dedicated this song to their former member.

The fifth album "Bam Bam" was released 4 October 2019.

== Discography ==
=== Albums ===
Year	Title	Chart positions				Certifications
Year	Title	GER	AUT	FR	SWI	Certifications
2001	New Dubby Conquerors	17	34	—	—	GER: Gold
2003	Music Monks	4	12	—	15	GER: Gold
2005	Next!	2	3	71	11	GER: Platinum; AUT: Gold
2006	Live	3	4	—	26	GER: Gold
2012	Seeed	1	2	—	5	GER: Platinum
2019	Bam Bam	2	3	—	3	

=== Singles ===
Year	Title	Chart positions				Album
Year	Title	GER	AUT	SWI	EUR	Album
2000	"New Dubby Conquerors"	—	—	—	—	New Dubby Conquerors
2000	"The Tide Is High"	—	—	—	—	New Dubby Conquerors
2001	"Dickes B" (featuring Black Kappa)	27	68	91	—	New Dubby Conquerors
2001	"Riddim No. 1"	—	—	—	—	New Dubby Conquerors
2001	"Dancehall Caballeros"	44	—	—	—	New Dubby Conquerors
2002	"Waterpumpee" (featuring Anthony B)	—	—	—	—	Waterpumpee/Music Monks
2003	"Music Monks"	27	28	81	—	Music Monks
2003	"Shake Baby Shake" (featuring Elephant Man)	—	—	—	—	Electric Boogie/Music Monks
2003	"What You Deserve Is What You Get"	48	—	—	—	Electric Boogie/Music Monks
2004	"Release"	54	47	71	—	Music Monks
2005	"Aufstehn!" (featuring Cee-Lo Green)	5	14	28	20	Next!
2005	"Schwinger"	68	57	—	—	Next!
2006	"Ding"	5	4	27	13	Next!
2006	"Slowlife"	—	—	—	—	Next!
2011	"Molotov"	12	—	—	—	Seeed
2012	"Beautiful"	22	47	—	—	Seeed
2012	"Augenbling"	7	12	15	—	Seeed
2013	"Deine Zeit"	70	—	—	—	Seeed
2014	"Cherry Oh"	16	41	64	—	Non-album single
2019	"Ticket"	63	—	—	—	Bam Bam
2019	"Lass sie gehn"	42	—	—	—	Bam Bam
2019	"G€ld"	59	—	—	—	Bam Bam
2019	"Sie is geladen" (featuring Nura)	88	—	—	—	Bam Bam

=== EPs ===
- 2002: Waterpumpee
- 2003: The Electric Boogie
- 2005: Aufstehn!
- 2011: Molotov / Wonderful Life
- 2012: Beautiful

=== DVD ===
- 2006: Live!

=== Riddims ===
- "Rodeo" (2005 Germaican Rec.)
- "Rodeo Refix" (2005 Germaican Rec.)
- "High Noon" (2005 Germaican Rec.)
- "Curefix" (2004 Germaican Rec.)
- "Doctors Darling" (2003 Germaican Rec.)
- "Electric Boogie" (2003 Germaican Rec.)
- "Pharaoh" (2003 Germaican Rec.)
- "FrogAss" (2001 Germaican Rec.)
