= Peter Fox (musician) =

German musician

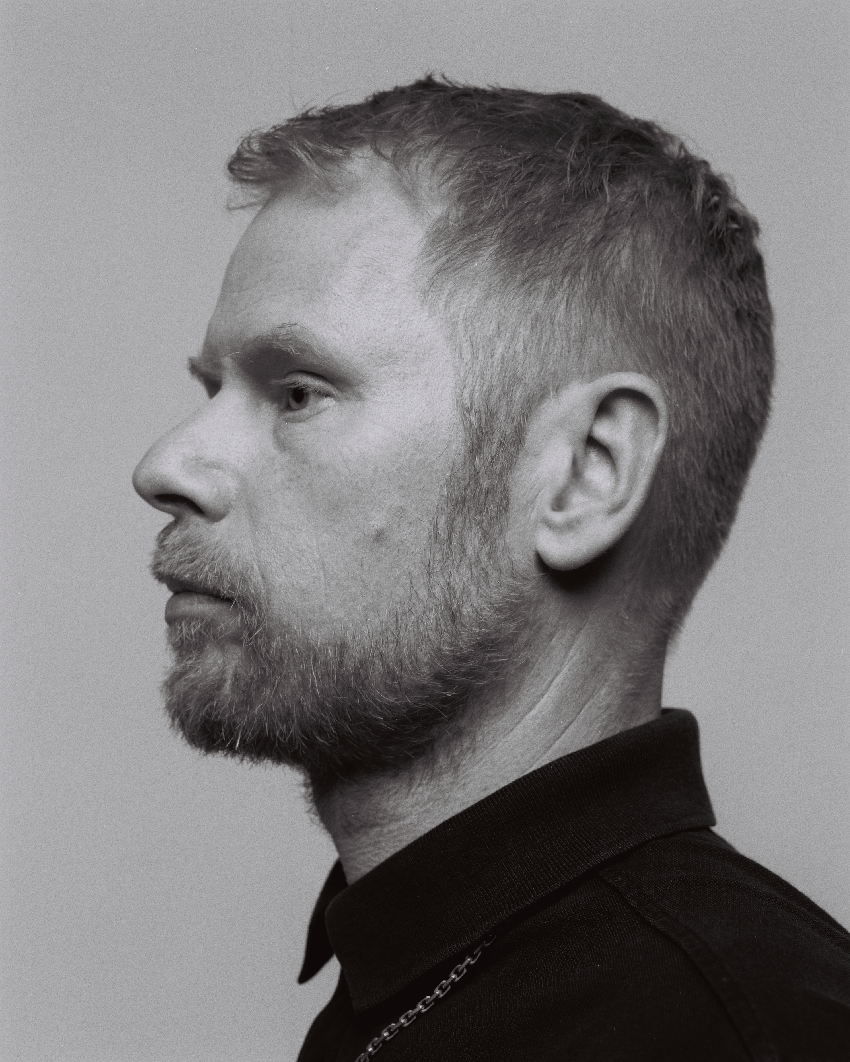
- Fox in 2020

Background information
- Also known as: Enuff
- Born: Pierre Steffen Baigorry; 3 September 1971 (age 54); West Berlin, West Germany
- Genres: Reggae; hip-hop; pop; dancehall; alternative hip-hop
- Occupations: Singer; songwriter; musician
- Instruments: Vocals; guitar; piano
- Years active: 1998–present
- Label: Warner
- Website: peterfox.de

Pierre Steffen Baigorry (born 3 September 1971), better known as Peter Fox, is a German singer, rapper, songwriter and musician. He is a member of the German reggae and dancehall band Seeed.

== Solo career ==
Fox started working on a solo album named Stadtaffe ("Urban Ape") in 2007. The album was released in Germany on 26 September 2008. Monk and DJ Illvibe co-produced the album, and the Deutsches Filmorchester Babelsberg and Cold Steel Drumline contributed to the music.

A sample of the song "Fieber" ("Fever"), which Fox sings with K.I.Z, was released on Fox's MySpace website on 1 November 2007. The first single, "Alles neu" ("Everything New"), was released on 15 August 2008. The second single of the album, "Haus am See" ("House by the Lake"), was released on 17 October 2008.

Fox also had several gigs with other artists, such as the song "Marry Me" by Miss Platnum, "Rodeo" by Sido and Sekundenschlaf by Marteria.

Peter Fox won the Bundesvision Song Contest 2009 on 13 February with his song "Schwarz zu blau" ("Black to Blue"), which is a social realistic representation of his home city Berlin and the transition from nightlife to dawn. The contest was held in Potsdam (the state capital of the previous year's winner Brandenburg).

He has since announced that he will be returning to Seeed due to unwanted stress and attention generated by his highly successful solo album Stadtaffe. His single "Haus am See" was the 82nd-best-selling single of 2008 and the 17th-best-selling single of 2009 in Germany.

His single "Alles neu" was notably sampled by English rapper Plan B for the track "Ill Manors" in 2012.

Although Peter Fox declared his solo career over in 2009, he released the song "Zukunft Pink" in October 2022. His second studio album Love Songs was released on 26 May 2023.

== Personal life ==
Fox grew up in Schönow in West Berlin, the son of a German father and a French mother.

He lives in Berlin's Lichterfelde West neighbourhood with his family.

In late 2001, he suffered from facial nerve paralysis that was not treated quickly enough because of a misdiagnosis. The right side of his face is still slightly paralysed, and has since become part of his signature look.

== Discography ==
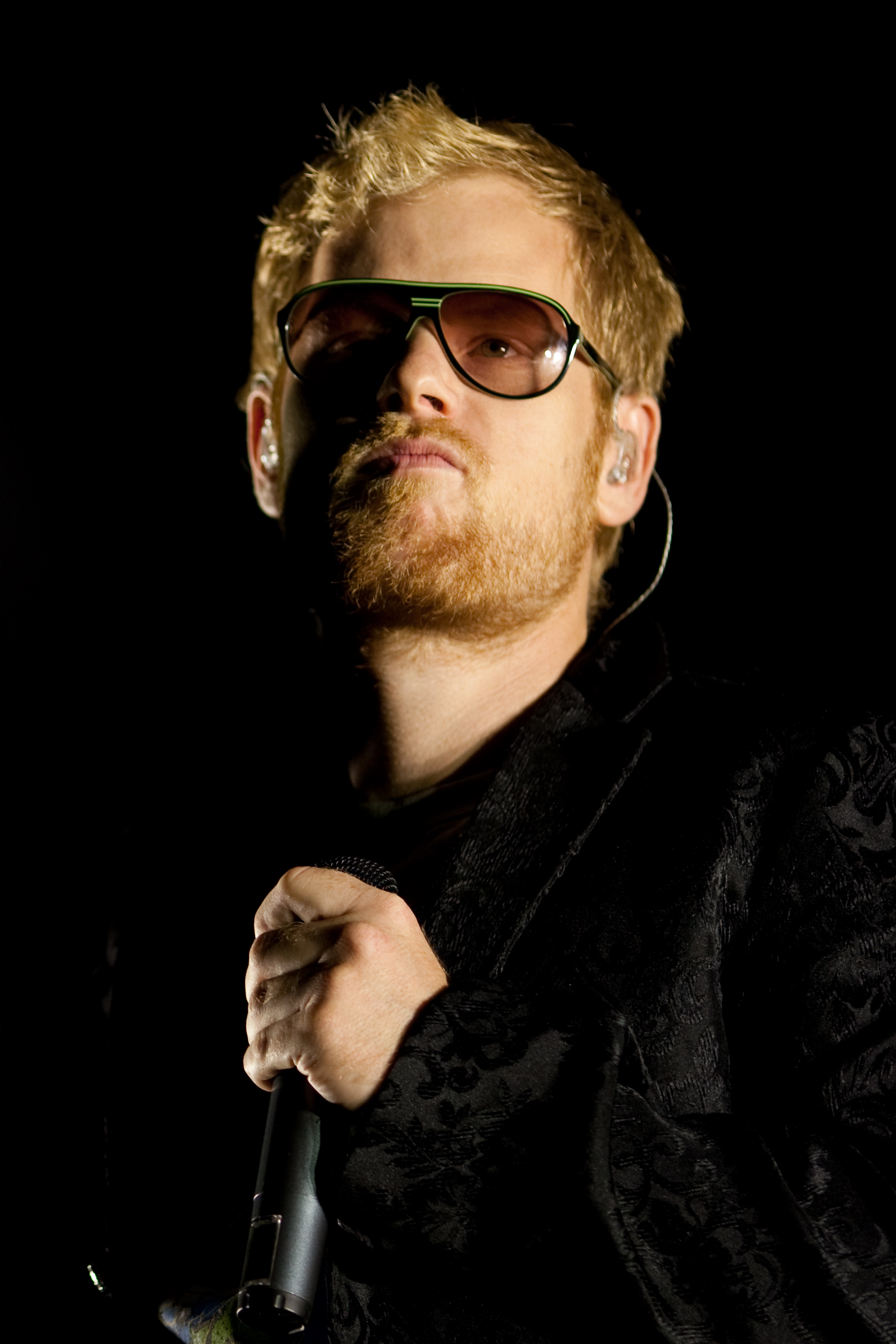
Fox in 2009

=== Studio albums ===
List of studio albums, with selected chart positions and certifications
Title	Details	Peak chart positions					Certifications
Title	Details	GER	AUT	BEL (Fl)	NLD	SWI	Certifications
Stadtaffe	Released: 26 September 2008; Label: Downbeat; Formats: Digital download, streaming	1	1	13	10	4	BVMI: 15× Gold; IFPI AUT: 2× Platinum; IFPI SWI: Gold
Love Songs	Released: 26 May 2023; Label: Warner; Formats: Digital download, streaming	1	1	—	—	1	

=== Live albums ===
List of live albums, with selected chart positions and certifications
Title	Details	Peak chart positions			Certifications
Title	Details	GER	AUT	SWI	Certifications
Live aus Berlin (as Peter Fox & Cold Steel)	Released: 27 November 2009; Label: Downbeat; Formats: Digital download, streaming	2	*	48	BVMI: Platinum
* see chart positions for the video album

=== Video albums ===
List of video albums, with selected chart positions and certifications
Title	Details	Peak chart positions			Certifications
Title	Details	GER	AUT	SWI	Certifications
Live aus Berlin (as Peter Fox & Cold Steel)	Released: 27 November 2009; Label: Downbeat; Formats: Digital download	*	1	*	BVMI: 4× Platinum; IFPI AUT: Gold; IFPI SWI: Platinum
* see chart positions for the live album

=== Singles ===
List of singles, with selected chart positions and certifications, showing album name and year released
Title	Year	Peak chart positions					Certifications	Album
Title	Year	GER	AUT	BEL (Fl)	NLD	SWI	Certifications	Album
"Fieber" (featuring K.I.Z)	2007	—	—	—	—	—		Stadtaffe
"Alles neu"	2008	4	11	—	—	49	BVMI: 5× Gold; IFPI AUT: Gold	Stadtaffe
"Haus am See"	2008	8	6	8	4	16	BVMI: 5× Gold; IFPI AUT: Gold	Stadtaffe
"Schwarz zu blau"	2009	3	17	—	—	36	BVMI: 3× Gold; IFPI AUT: Gold	Stadtaffe
"Zukunft Pink" (featuring Inéz)	2022	1	3	—	—	21	BVMI: 3× Gold; IFPI AUT: Platinum	Love Songs
"Vergessen wie"	2023	11	40	—	—	—		Love Songs
"Weisse Fahnen"	2023	29	74	—	—	—		Love Songs
"Ein Auge blau"	2023	14	39	—	—	—		Love Songs
"Tuff Cookie"	2023	20	60	—	—	—		Love Songs
"Toast" (with Reezy)	2024	15	41	—	—	71		Non-album single

== Awards ==
- 1LIVE "Krone"
  - 2008 Best Album (Stadtaffe)
- Echo Awards
  - 2009 Hip-Hop/Urban
  - 2009 Critics Award
  - 2009 Producer of the Year
  - 2010 Album of the Year (Stadtaffe)
- European Border Breakers Award
  - 2010 European cross border success of the album Stadtaffe
