= Bundesvision Song Contest 2012 =

German music competition

Date and venue
- Final: 28 September 2012
- Venue: Max-Schmeling-Halle, Berlin

Organisation
- Presenters: Stefan Raab; Sandra Rieß; Elton (green room)
- Participation map: Legend; 1st place 2nd place 3rd place 4th place 5th place 6th place 7th place 8th place 9th place 10th place 11th place 12th place 13th place 14th place 15th place 16th place

Vote
- Voting system: Each state awards 12, 10, 8–1 point(s) to their top 10 songs.
- Winning song: Baden-Württemberg "Schau nicht mehr zurück" by Xavas (Xavier Naidoo and Kool Savas)

The Bundesvision Song Contest 2012 was the eighth edition of the annual Bundesvision Song Contest musical event. The contest was held on 28 September 2012 at the Max-Schmeling-Halle, Berlin, following Tim Bendzko's win in the 2011 contest in North Rhine-Westphalia with the song "Wenn Worte meine Sprache wären". This was the second time that the Max-Schmeling-Halle arena had hosted the contest after previously hosting in 2010, and Berlin's third time of hosting the contest, after previously hosting in 2007, and 2010. The contest was hosted by Stefan Raab, Sandra Rieß, and Elton in the green room.

== Contest overview ==
The winner of the Bundesvision Song Contest 2012 was Xavas (Xavier Naidoo and Kool Savas) with the song "Schau nicht mehr zurück", representing Baden-Württemberg, the song also reached number 2 in the German singles chart. In second place was Laing (band) representing Saxony, and third place to Ich kann fliegen representing Lower Saxony.

Rüdiger Linhof, and Weber, members from Sportfreunde Stiller from 2008, return to the contest as part of "Phantom Orchester" singing with Fiva, representing Bavaria for a second time. Boris Lauterbach from Fettes Brot who represented Schleswig-Holstein in 2005, returns under the name "Der König tanzt" representing Hamburg.

Berlin's 2006 winning band Seeed, performed as the opening act, singing "Augenbling" and "Beautiful". Tim Bendzko performed as the interval act singing his winning song from 2011, "Wenn Worte meine Sprache wären".

10 of the 16 states awarded themselves the maximum of 12 points, with Bavaria, Berlin, Brandenburg, Hesse, Rhineland-Palatinate, and Saxony-Anhalt awarding themselves 10, 8, 8, 8, 10, and 8 points respectively.

== Results ==
Bundesvision Song Contest 2012
R/O	State	Artist	Song	English translation	Points	Place
1	North Rhine-Westphalia	Luxuslärm	"Liebt sie dich wie ich?"	Does she love you like I do?	97	4
2	Hesse	Cris Cosmo	"Herzschlag"	Heartbeat	19	12
3	Thuringia	Maras April	"Himmel aus Eis"	Heaven of ice	33	9
4	Rhineland-Palatinate	Pickers	"1000 Meilen"	1000 miles	20	11
5	Bavaria	Fiva & the Phantom Orchester (with Linhof and Weber from Sportfreunde Stiller)	"Die Stadt gehört wieder mir"	The city belongs to me again	13	14
6	Brandenburg	Mellow Mark feat. Nina Maleika	"Bleib bei mir"	Stay with me	8	16
7	Mecklenburg-Vorpommern	The Love Bülow	"Nie mehr"	Never again	41	8
8	Schleswig-Holstein	Vierkanttretlager	"Fotoalbum"	Photo album	76	6
9	Saarland	Die Orsons feat. Cro	"Horst & Monika"	—	92	5
10	Saxony-Anhalt	Johanna Zeul	"Sandmann"	Sandman	10	15
11	Lower Saxony	Ich kann fliegen	"Mich kann nur Liebe retten"	Only love can save me	109	3
12	Berlin	B-Tight	"Drinne"	Inside	50	7
13	Bremen	Schné	"Alles aus Liebe"	All out of love	18	13
14	Hamburg	Der König tanzt	"Häuserwand"	Exterior wall	28	10
15	Saxony	Laing	"Morgens immer müde"	Always tired in the morning	142	2
16	Baden-Württemberg	Xavas (Xavier Naidoo and Kool Savas)	"Schau nicht mehr zurück"	And I don't look back anymore	172	1

== Scoreboard ==
	Voting results																
Mecklenburg-Vorpommern	41	12	1	1	2			1	3	2	1	1	4	1	3	7	2
Saxony-Anhalt	10		8			2											
Schleswig-Holstein	76	4	4	12	5	4	4	3	5	4	5	3	7	2	5	4	5
Brandenburg	8				8												
Baden-Württemberg	172	10	12	10	10	12	10	12	10	10	10	12	10	12	10	12	10
Saarland	92	6	5	4	7	8	12	5	6	5	6	4	3	5	4	6	6
Bavaria	13					1	1	10	1								
Saxony	142	8	10	8	12	10	6	8	12	8	8	10	8	8	8	10	8
Thuringia	33	1	2				2	2	4	12		5	2			3	
Lower Saxony	109	7	7	7	6	5	5	7	8	7	12	7	6	6	7	5	7
Hesse	19					7						8		4			
Hamburg	28	2		5	1					1	2		12		2		3
Rhineland-Palatinate	20						8							10		1	1
Bremen	18			3							3				12		
Berlin	50	3	3	2	4	3	3	4	2	3	4	2	1	3	1	8	4
North Rhine-Westfalia	97	5	6	6	3	6	7	6	7	6	7	6	5	7	6	2	12
