= Bundesvision Song Contest 2013 =

German music competition

Date and venue
- Final: 26 September 2013
- Venue: SAP Arena, Mannheim, Baden-Württemberg

Organisation
- Presenters: Stefan Raab; Sandra Rieß; Elton (green room)
- Participation map: Legend; 1st place 2nd place 3rd place 4th place 5th place 6th place 7th place 8th place 9th place 10th place 11th place 12th place 13th place 14th place 15th place 16th place

Vote
- Voting system: Each state awards 12, 10, 8–1 points to their top 10 songs.
- Winning song: Lower Saxony "So oder so" by Bosse

The Bundesvision Song Contest 2013 was the ninth edition of the annual Bundesvision Song Contest musical event. The contest was held on 26 September 2013 at the SAP Arena in Mannheim, Baden-Württemberg, following Xavas's win in the 2012 contest in Berlin with the song "Schau nicht mehr zurück". The contest was hosted by Stefan Raab, Sandra Rieß, and Elton in the green room. The contest was produced by Brainpool TV.

== Contest overview ==
The winner of the Bundesvision Song Contest 2013 was Bosse with the song "So oder so", representing Lower Saxony. In second place was Johannes Oerding representing Hamburg, and third place to MC Fitti representing Berlin. Bosse's song was released in August 2013, placing at number 83 on the German single chart; after winning the contest, the song rose to number 25.

Returning artists include Bosse who represented Lower Saxony with Anna Loos in 2011, and Pohlmann who represented North Rhine-Westphalia in 2007.

14 of the 16 states awarded themselves the maximum of 12 points, with Mecklenburg-Vorpommern, and North Rhine-Westphalia awarding themselves 8 points each.

== Results ==
Bundesvision Song Contest 2013
R/O	State	Artist	Song	English translation	Points	Place
1	Rhineland-Palatinate	Mega! Mega!	"Strobo"	—	31	10
2	Hesse	Sing um dein Leben	"Unter meiner Haut"	Under my skin	29	11
3	Mecklenburg-Vorpommern	Guaia Guaia	"Terrorist"	—	8	16
4	Thuringia	Hannes Kinder & Band	"Déjà-vu"	—	13	13
5	Hamburg	Johannes Oerding	"Nichts geht mehr"	The die is cast	145	2
6	Bavaria	Charly Bravo	"Dreckige Namen"	Dirty names	12	14
7	Schleswig-Holstein	Luna Simao	"Es geht bis zu den Wolken"	It reaches up to the clouds	68	6
8	North Rhine-Westphalia	Pohlmann	"Atmen"	Breathing	20	12
9	Saarland	DCVDNS	"Eigentlich wollte Nate Dogg die Hook singen"	Actually, Nate Dogg wanted to sing the hook	91	5
10	Saxony-Anhalt	Adolar	"Halleluja"	Hallelujah	12	15
11	Bremen	De fofftig Penns	"Löppt"	It works	61	7
12	Brandenburg	Keule	"Ja genau!"	Yes exactly!	94	4
13	Baden-Württemberg	Max Herre feat. Sophie Hunger	"Fremde"	Strangers	51	8
14	Saxony	The toten Crackhuren im Kofferraum	"Ich brauch keine Wohnung"	I don't need a flat	35	9
15	Lower Saxony	Bosse	"So oder so"	So or so	153	1
16	Berlin	MC Fitti	"Fitti mitm Bart"	Fitti with the beard	105	3

== Scoreboard ==
	Voting results																
Baden-Württemberg	51	12	3	1	4	1	2	4	2	3	3	4	4	3	2	2	1
Bavaria	12		12														
Berlin	105	6	6	12	8	6	5	7	6	7	7	6	6	6	6	6	5
Brandenburg	94	4	5	8	12	5	6	5	5	6	5	3	5	7	7	4	7
Bremen	61	2	2	6	3	12	8	2	4	8	2	1	1	2	1	7	
Hamburg	145	8	10	7	7	8	12	10	10	10	12	8	7	8	8	10	10
Hesse	29	3			1	2		12		2	1	5	2			1	
Mecklenburg-Vorpommern	8								8								
Lower Saxony	153	10	7	10	10	10	10	8	12	12	10	10	8	10	10	8	8
North Rhine-Westfalia	20						3				8					3	6
Rhineland-Palatinate	31			2		7						12	10				
Saarland	91	7	8	4	5	3	4	6	7	4	6	7	12	5	5	5	3
Saxony	35	1	1	3	6		1	1	1	1				12	4		4
Saxony-Anhalt	12														12		
Schleswig-Holstein	68	5	4	5	2	4	7	3	3	5	4	2	3	4	3	12	2
Thuringia	13													1			12
