= Bundesvision Song Contest =

German song competition

- Genre: Song competition
- Created by: Stefan Raab
- Based on: Eurovision Song Contest
- Country of origin: Germany
- Original language: German
- No. of episodes: 11 contests

Production
- Executive producer: Jörg Grabosch
- Production company: Brainpool TV

Original release
- Network: ProSieben
- Release: 12 February 2005 – 29 August 2015

The Bundesvision Song Contest (often shortened BSC or BuViSoCo) was a song competition held annually between the sixteen states of Germany. Created by German entertainer Stefan Raab and aired live on ProSieben, the show was loosely based on the Eurovision Song Contest, with slightly different rules aiming at promoting German-language music by requiring that at least 50% of each song's lyrics were performed in German.

== History ==
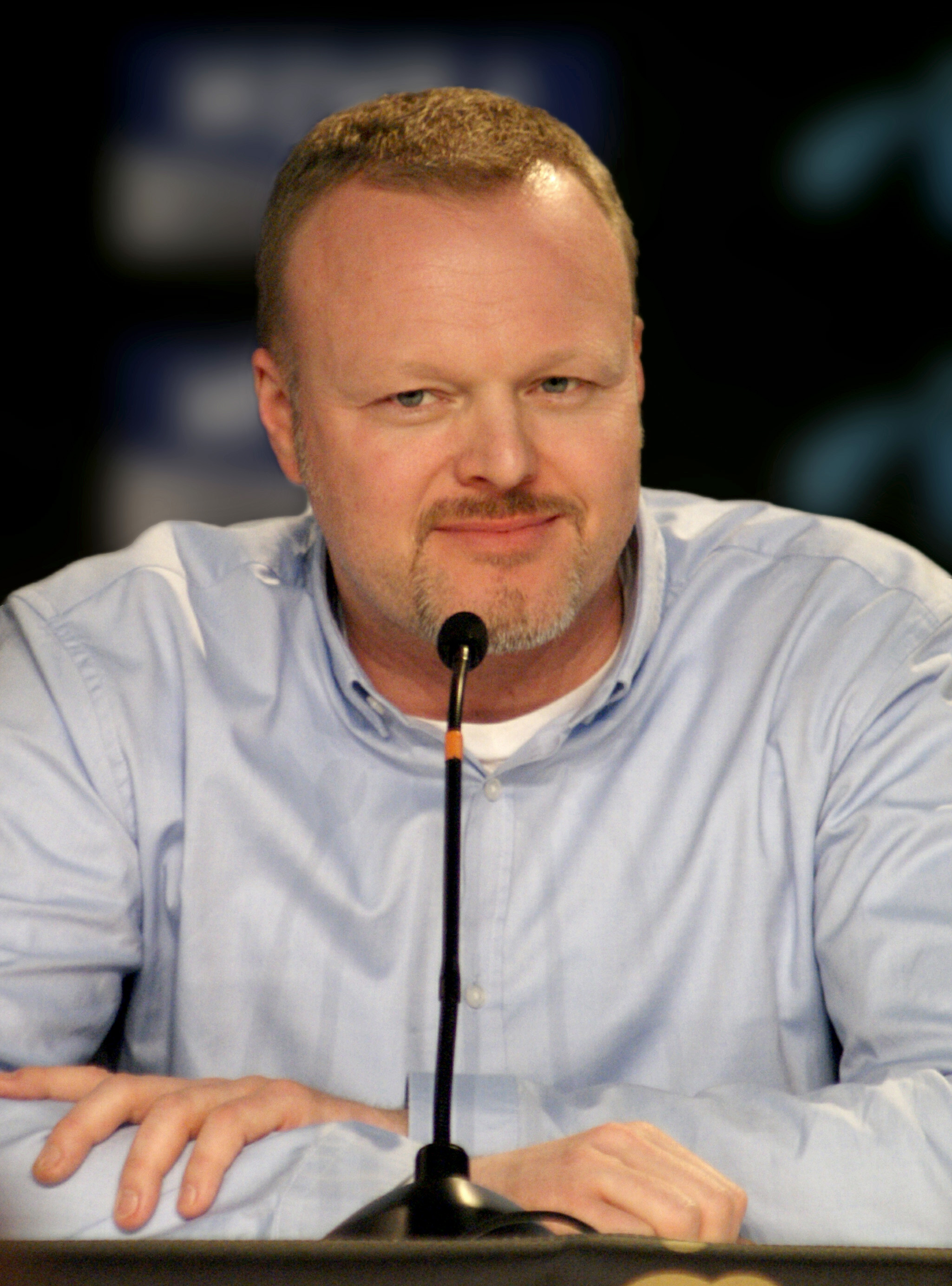
Stefan Raab created and hosted the contest.

The Bundesvision Song Contest was created by Stefan Raab in 2005, in the vein of the Eurovision Song Contest. The contest was held annually between 2005 and 2015, however, after Raab retired in late 2015, the 2016 edition of the contest was not held, although the show was not officially cancelled. The contest was not held since, and in June 2019, ProSieben stated that it was not planning to produce further editions.

== Format ==
States which have hosted the contest A single hosting Multiple hostings

The Bundesvision Song Contest followed a similar format as the Eurovision Song Contest: All sixteen states of Germany (German: Bundesländer) entered one song that was performed live on the night of the show, and once all states have performed, a winner was decided by tele-vote.

== Contests ==
Year	Date	Host city	Winner	Artist	Song	Points
2005	12 February	(North Rhine-Westphalia) Oberhausen	Hesse	Juli	"Geile Zeit"	159
2006	9 February	(Hesse) Wetzlar	Berlin	Seeed	"Ding"	151
2007	9 February	Berlin	Lower Saxony	Oomph! feat. Marta Jandová	"Träumst du?"	147
2008	14 February	(Lower Saxony) Hanover	Brandenburg	Subway to Sally	"Auf Kiel"	147
2009	13 February	(Brandenburg) Potsdam	Berlin	Peter Fox	"Schwarz zu blau"	174
2010	1 October	Berlin	North Rhine-Westphalia	Unheilig	"Unter deiner Flagge"	164
2011	29 September	(North Rhine-Westphalia) Cologne	Berlin	Tim Bendzko	"Wenn Worte meine Sprache wären"	141
2012	28 September	Berlin	Baden-Württemberg	Xavas (Xavier Naidoo and Kool Savas)	"Schau nicht mehr zurück"	172
2013	26 September	(Baden-Württemberg) Mannheim	Lower Saxony	Bosse	"So oder so"	153
2014	20 September	(Lower Saxony) Göttingen	Bremen	Revolverheld	"Lass uns gehen"	180
2015	29 August	(Bremen (state)) Bremen	Rhineland-Palatinate	Mark Forster	"Bauch und Kopf"	170

== Total ranking ==
Each state's win record in the contest

State	Points	Wins	2015	2014	2013	2012	2011	2010	2009	2008	2007	2006	2005
Berlin	1,035	3	23 (11)	16 (12)	105 (3)	50 (7)	141 (1)	100 (3)	174 (1)	66 (7)	96 (4)	151 (1)	113 (3)
Lower Saxony	864	2	84 (4)	15 (13)	153 (1)	109 (3)	102 (3)	4 (16)	12 (15)	94 (4)	147 (1)	59 (6)	85 (4)
Baden-Württemberg	789	1	82 (6)	58 (7)	51 (8)	172 (1)	91 (4)	39 (9)	103 (4)	46 (9)	23 (10)	47 (9)	77 (5)
Thuringia	761	0	114 (3)	25 (11)	13 (13)	33 (9)	13 (12)	79 (6)	53 (6)	146 (2)	88 (6)	134 (3)	63 (7)
North Rhine-Westphalia	759	1	117 (2)	46 (8)	20 (12)	97 (4)	76 (7)	164 (1)	112 (3)	16 (14)	95 (5)	6 (16)	10 (15)
Schleswig-Holstein	703	0	28 (10)	87 (5)	68 (6)	76 (6)	8 (16)	60 (7)	44 (8)	75 (6)	101 (3)	26 (11)	130 (2)
Bremen	668	1	46 (9)	180 (1)	61 (7)	18 (13)	111 (2)	20 (11)	25 (11)	20 (11)	20 (11)	136 (2)	31 (11)
Hamburg	665	0	14 (13)	28 (10)	145 (2)	28 (10)	66 (8)	40 (8)	73 (5)	19 (12)	138 (2)	70 (5)	44 (9)
Hesse	621	1	76 (7)	33 (9)	29 (11)	19 (11)	12 (13)	18 (13)	53 (6)	51 (8)	67 (7)	104 (4)	159 (1)
Saxony	617	0	84 (4)	10 (16)	35 (9)	142 (2)	89 (5)	20 (11)	131 (2)	12 (15)	13 (13)	10 (15)	71 (6)
Brandenburg	545	1	50 (8)	10 (15)	94 (4)	8 (16)	12 (13)	87 (5)	37 (9)	147 (1)	11 (15)	35 (10)	54 (8)
Rhineland-Palatinate	526	1	170 (1)	124 (2)	31 (10)	20 (11)	86 (6)	17 (14)	23 (12)	17 (13)	10 (16)	18 (12)	10 (15)
Saxony-Anhalt	490	0	13 (14)	102 (3)	12 (14)	10 (15)	12 (13)	152 (2)	10 (16)	96 (3)	56 (8)	12 (14)	15 (13)
Mecklenburg-Vorpommern	425	0	10 (15)	101 (4)	8 (16)	41 (8)	66 (8)	22 (10)	23 (12)	79 (5)	13 (13)	50 (8)	12 (14)
Bavaria	397	0	2 (16)	81 (6)	12 (14)	13 (14)	26 (10)	94 (4)	34 (10)	32 (10)	33 (9)	53 (7)	17 (12)
Saarland	328	0	15 (12)	12 (14)	91 (5)	92 (5)	17 (11)	12 (15)	21 (14)	12 (15)	17 (12)	17 (13)	37 (10)

== Presenters ==
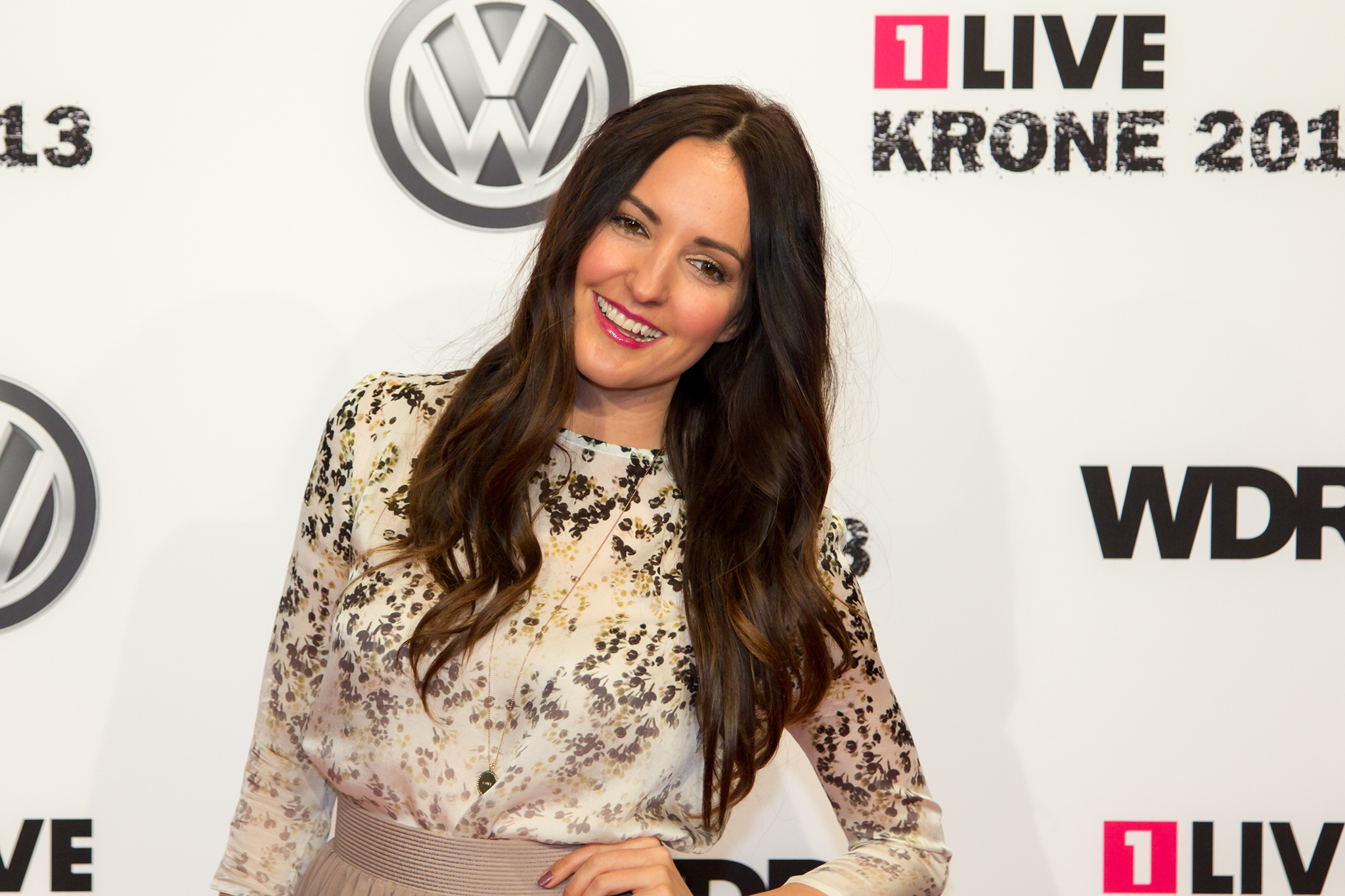
Johanna Klum co-presented the show from 2007 to 2011.

Year	Host	Main presenter	Green Room	Fan block
2005	Stefan Raab	Annette Frier	Oliver Pocher	—N/a
2006	Stefan Raab	Janin Reinhardt	Elton	—N/a
2007	Stefan Raab	Johanna Klum	Elton	—N/a
2008	Stefan Raab	Johanna Klum	Elton	—N/a
2009	Stefan Raab	Johanna Klum	Elton	—N/a
2010	Stefan Raab	Johanna Klum	Elton	—N/a
2011	Stefan Raab	Johanna Klum	Lena Meyer-Landrut	Elton
2012	Stefan Raab	Sandra Rieß	Elton	—N/a
2013	Stefan Raab	Sandra Rieß	Elton	—N/a
2014	Stefan Raab	—N/a	Elton	—N/a
2015	Stefan Raab	—N/a	Elton	—N/a

== See also ==
- American Song Contest
- Regio Songfestival
