= Bundesvision Song Contest 2015 =

Song contest

Date and venue
- Final: 29 August 2015
- Venue: ÖVB Arena, Bremen

Organisation
- Presenters: Stefan Raab; Elton (green room)

Participants
- Number of entries: 16
Participation map
- 1st	2nd	3rd	4th	16th

Vote
- Voting system: Each state awards 12, 10, 8–1 points to their top 10 songs.
- Winning song: Rhineland-Palatinate "Bauch und Kopf" by Mark Forster

The Bundesvision Song Contest 2015 was the eleventh and final edition of the annual Bundesvision Song Contest musical event. The contest took place in the state of Bremen, following Revolverheld's victory with the song "Lass uns gehen" ("Let's go") in the previous edition.

== Returning artists ==
Baden-Württemberg's Glasperlenspiel came fourth in the 2011 contest. Also Lower Saxony's Madsen also came fourth in the 2008 contest.

== Participants ==
Bundesvision Song Contest 2015
R/O	State	Artist	Song	English translation	Points	Place
1	Hamburg	Ferris MC	"Monstertruck"	—	14	13
2	Brandenburg	Ewig	"Ein Geschenk"	A gift	50	8
3	Saarland	PerDu	"Lange nicht getanzt"	Long time not danced	15	12
4	Saxony-Anhalt	3Viertelelf	"Mona Lisa"	—	13	14
5	Baden-Württemberg	Glasperlenspiel	"Geiles Leben"	Awesome life	82	6
6	Saxony	Radio Doria	"Sehnsucht Nr. 7"	Longing number 7	84	4
7	Schleswig-Holstein	Jeden Tag Silvester	"Dein Glück"	Your luck	28	10
8	North Rhine-Westphalia	Donots	"Dann ohne mich"	Then without me	117	2
9	Berlin	Lary	"Bedtime Blues"	—	23	11
10	Mecklenburg-Vorpommern	Buddy Buxbaum	"Termin im Park"	Meeting at the park	10	15
11	Thuringia	Yvonne Catterfeld	"Lieber so"	Rather so	114	3
12	Bavaria	Wunderkynd	"Hallo, Hallo"	Hello, hello	2	16
13	Lower Saxony	Madsen	"Küss mich!"	Kiss me!	84	4
14	Bremen	Gloria	"Geister"	Ghosts	46	9
15	Hesse	Namika	"Hellwach"	Wide awake	76	7
16	Rhineland-Palatinate	Mark Forster	"Bauch und Kopf"	Belly and head	170	1

== Scoreboard ==
	Voting results																
Hamburg	14	10						4									
Brandenburg	50	1	12	5	1	3	8		1	8		6	1		3	1	
Saarland	15			12													3
Saxony-Anhalt	13				12										1		
Baden-Württemberg	82	3	6	6	4	12	5	3	6	4	2	3	4	3	5	6	10
Saxony	84		8	2	7	5	12	1	4	5	6	8	5	4	4	5	8
Schleswig-Holstein	38	8						12		1	5			2			
North Rhine-Westphalia	117	7	5	8	6	7	6	8	12	6	7	7	8	8	7	8	7
Berlin	23		2	1		1	1		2	10		1		1		2	2
Mecklenburg-Vorpommern	10										10						
Thuringia	114	6	7	7	8	8	7	6	8	7	8	12	10	5	2	7	6
Bavaria	2												2				
Lower Saxony	84	5	4	4	5	4	4	7	5	3	4	5	6	12	8	4	4
Bremen	46	2	1		2	2	3	2	3		3	2	3	7	12	3	1
Hesse	76	4	3	3	3	6	2	5	7	2	1	4	7	6	6	12	5
Rhineland-Palatinate	170	12	10	10	10	10	10	10	10	12	12	10	12	10	10	10	12
