= Bundesvision Song Contest 2014 =

German music competition

Date and venue
- Final: 20 September 2014
- Venue: Lokhalle, Göttingen, Lower Saxony

Organisation
- Presenters: Stefan Raab; Elton (green room)
- Participation map: Legend; 1st place 2nd place 3rd place 4th place 5th place 6th place 7th place 8th place 9th place 10th place 11th place 12th place 13th place 14th place 15th place 16th place

Vote
- Voting system: Each state awards 12, 10, 8–1 points to their top 10 songs.
- Winning song: Bremen "Lass uns gehen" by Revolverheld

The Bundesvision Song Contest 2014 was the tenth edition of the annual Bundesvision Song Contest musical event. The contest was held on 20 September 2014 at the Lokhalle in Göttingen, Lower Saxony, following Bosse's win in the 2012 contest in Berlin with the song "So oder so". The contest was hosted by Stefan Raab, and Elton in the green room.

== Contest overview ==
The winner of the Bundesvision Song Contest 2014 was Revolverheld with the song "Lass uns gehen", representing Bremen. In second place were Jupiter Jones representing Rhineland-Palatinate, and third place to Teesy representing Saxony-Anhalt.

Returning artist include: Jupiter Jones (2011), Revolverheld (2006), Andreas Bourani (2011), Marteria (2009), Flo Mega (2011), DCVDNS (2013; member of Inglebirds) and Philipp Breitenstein (2013 with Hannes Kinder & Band; member of Duerer).

Max Mutzke is the first artist to participate in the Eurovision Song Contest (2004) and then enter the Bundesvision Song Contest. This is the reverse of previous artists Sandy Mölling, and Nadja Benaissa who both participated as No Angels for Germany in the Eurovision Song Contest 2008, before entering the Bundesvision Song Contest.

7 of the 16 states awarded themselves the maximum of 12 points, with Baden-Württemberg, Bavaria, Berlin, Brandenburg, Hamburg, Hesse, Lower Saxony, North Rhine-Westphalia, and Saxony, awarding themselves 10, 10, 8, 7, 10, 10, 10, 10, and 10 points each respectively.

The contest was broadcast by ProSieben and watched by 1.44 million people, and was the highest rated competition since 2011.

== Results ==
Bundesvision Song Contest 2014
R/O	State	Artist	Song	English translation	Points	Place
1	Bavaria	Andreas Bourani	"Auf anderen Wegen" (de)	On other ways	81	6
2	Hamburg	Nico Suave feat. Flo Mega	"Gedicht"	Poem	28	10
3	Brandenburg	Kitty Kat	"Hochhaus"	Skyscraper	10	15
4	Saxony	Sebastian Hackel	"Warum sie lacht"	Why she laughs	10	15
5	Baden-Württemberg	Max Mutzke	"Charlotte"	—	58	7
6	Thuringia	Duerer	"Was gestern war"	What was yesterday	25	11
7	Saarland	Inglebirds	"Getti"	—	12	14
8	Saxony-Anhalt	Teesy	"Keine Rosen"	No roses	102	3
9	Hesse	OK Kid	"Unterwasserliebe"	Underwater love	33	9
10	Lower Saxony	Sierra Kidd	"20.000 Rosen"	20,000 roses	15	13
11	North Rhine-Westphalia	Maxim	"Alles versucht"	Tried everything	46	8
12	Schleswig-Holstein	Tonbandgerät	"Alles geht"	Everything goes	87	5
13	Mecklenburg-Vorpommern	Marteria	"Mein Rostock"	My Rostock	101	4
14	Rhineland-Palatinate	Jupiter Jones	"Plötzlich hält die Welt an"	Suddenly the world stops turning	124	2
15	Berlin	Miss Platnum	"Hüftgold Berlin"	Love handles Berlin	16	12
16	Bremen	Revolverheld	"Lass uns gehen" (de)	Let us go	180	1

== Scoreboard ==
	Voting results																
Baden-Württemberg	58	10	7	3		3	3	5	2	3	6	6	1	2	1	4	2
Bavaria	81	6	10	4	4	1	2	6	5	6	7	8	5	4	5	5	3
Berlin	16	1		8	3				3		1						
Brandenburg	10			1	7										2		
Bremen	180	12	12	12	12	12	12	12	10	12	12	10	10	12	10	10	10
Hamburg	28					7	10		1	1		2	4			3	
Hesse	33	2	3			4	4	10			2		7				1
Mecklenburg-Vorpommern	101	5	6	6	8	8	8	3	12	5	3	5	3	7	8	7	7
Lower Saxony	15		1					1		10		1				2	
North Rhine-Westfalia	46	4	2	2	2	2	1	2	4	2	10	3	2	1	4	1	4
Rhineland-Palatinate	124	7	5	7	10	10	6	8	8	7	5	12	8	8	7	8	8
Saarland	12												12				
Saxony	10													10			
Saxony-Anhalt	102	8	8	10	6	5	5	7	6	4	8	7		5	12	6	5
Schleswig-Holstein	87	3	4	5	5	6	7	4	7	8	4	4		6	6	12	6
Thuringia	25				1								6	3	3		12
