= Bundesvision Song Contest 2011 =

German music competition

Date and venue
- Final: 29 September 2011
- Venue: Lanxess Arena, Cologne, North Rhine-Westphalia

Organisation
- Presenters: Stefan Raab; Johanna Klum; Lena (green room); Elton (fan block)
- Participation map: Legend; 1st place 2nd place 3rd place 4th place 5th place 6th place 7th place 8th place 9th place 10th place 11th place 12th place 13th place 14th place 15th place 16th place

Vote
- Voting system: Each state awards 12, 10, 8–1 points to their top 10 songs.
- Winning song: Berlin "Wenn Worte meine Sprache wären" by Tim Bendzko

The Bundesvision Song Contest 2011 was the seventh edition of the annual Bundesvision Song Contest musical event. The contest was held on 29 September 2011 at the Lanxess Arena in Cologne, North Rhine-Westphalia, following Unheilig's win in the 2010 contest in Berlin with the song "Unter deiner Flagge". This was the second time that North Rhine-Westphalia had hosted the contest, after previously hosting in the first contest Oberhausen in 2005.

The contest was hosted by Stefan Raab, Johanna Klum, with Lena Meyer-Landrut; Germany's Eurovision Song Contest 2010 winner, and representative in the Eurovision Song Contest 2011 conducting interviews in the green room, whilst regular green room host Elton sat in the fan block.

== Contest overview ==
The winner of the Bundesvision Song Contest 2011 was Tim Bendzko with the song "Wenn Worte meine Sprache wären", representing Berlin, the state's third win. In second place was Flo Mega representing Bremen, and third place to Bosse and Anna Loos representing Lower Saxony.

Bundesvision Song Contest 2005 winners Juli returned participating for Hesse, the second time a former winner had returned to the contest after Peter Fox had competed and won in 2009, and before that as a member of Seeed who won in 2006. Other returning artists include Jennifer Rostock from 2008; again for Mecklenburg-Vorpommern, and Anna Loos representing Lower Saxony; who competed in the band Silly in 2010 for Saxony-Anhalt.

13 of the 16 states awarded themselves the maximum of 12 points, with Brandenburg, Saarland, and Schleswig-Holstein awarding themselves 10, 10, and 3 points respectively.

== Results ==
Bundesvision Song Contest 2011
R/O	State	Artist	Song	English translation	Points	Place
1	Mecklenburg-Vorpommern	Jennifer Rostock	"Ich kann nicht mehr"	I can't go on any longer	66	8
2	Saxony-Anhalt	Flimmerfrühstück	"Tu's nicht ohne Liebe"	Don't do it without love	12	13
3	Schleswig-Holstein	Muttersöhnchen	"Essen geh'n"	Eating out	8	16
4	Brandenburg	Doreen	"Wie konntest du nur?"	How could you dare	12	13
5	Baden-Württemberg	Glasperlenspiel	"Echt"	Real	91	4
6	Saarland	Pierre Ferdinand et les Charmeurs	"Ganz Paris ist eine Disco"	Whole of Paris is a disco	17	11
7	Bavaria	Andreas Bourani	"Eisberg"	Iceberg	26	10
8	Saxony	Kraftklub	"Ich will nicht nach Berlin"	I don't want to go to Berlin	89	5
9	Thuringia	Alin Coen Band	"Ich war hier"	I was here	13	12
10	Lower Saxony	Bosse & Anna Loos	"Frankfurt/Oder"	—	102	3
11	Hesse	Juli	"Du lügst so schön"	You lie so beautifully	12	13
12	Hamburg	Thees Uhlmann	"Zum Laichen und Sterben ziehen die Lachse den Fluss hinauf"	The salmons go up the river for spawning and dying	66	8
13	Rhineland-Palatinate	Jupiter Jones	"ImmerfürImmer"	AlwaysForEver	86	6
14	Bremen	Flo Mega	"Zurück"	Back	111	2
15	Berlin	Tim Bendzko	"Wenn Worte meine Sprache wären"	If words were my language	141	1
16	North Rhine-Westphalia	Frida Gold	"Unsere Liebe ist aus Gold"	Our love is made of gold	76	7

== Scoreboard ==
	Voting results																
Mecklenburg-Vorpommern	66	12	6	2	4	3	6	3	6	4	3		2	4	3	5	3
Saxony-Anhalt	12		12														
Schleswig-Holstein	8			3									5				
Brandenburg	12				10											2	
Baden-Württemberg	91	4	4	6	7	12	4	7	5	3	6	6		10	7	3	7
Saarland	17						10						7				
Bavaria	26	1				4		12			2	1		3	1	1	1
Saxony	89	3	3	4	6	6	2	6	12	10	4	5	4	5	4	10	5
Thuringia	13								1	12							
Lower Saxony	102	10	10	7	8	5	5	2	8	5	12	3	8	1	6	8	4
Hesse	12											12					
Hamburg	66	2	1	12	1	1	1	5	2	1	7	2	12	2	5	6	6
Rhineland-Palatinate	86	8	7	1	5	2	12	1	10	8	1	4	3	12	10		2
Bremen	111	5	2	8	2	8	7	8	3	6	10	8	10	7	12	7	8
Berlin	141	7	8	10	12	10	8	10	7	7	8	10	6	8	8	12	10
North Rhine-Westphalia	76	6	5	5	3	7	3	4	4	2	5	7	1	6	2	4	12
