= Jupiter Jones =

Jupiter Jones may refer to:

- Jupiter Jones, the lead investigator in the Three Investigators series of children's books
- Jupiter Jones, the protagonist of the 2015 film Jupiter Ascending, played by Mila Kunis
- Jupiter Jones, a German band
