= 105.6 FM =

FM radio frequency

This is a list of radio stations that broadcast on FM frequency 105.6 MHz:

== In Bangladesh ==
- Bangladesh Betar Rangpur (Govt. Radio)

== In China ==
- CNR The Voice of China in Karamay
- CNR Business Radio in Guiyang, Qujing and Xining
- GRT Pearl River Economic Radio in Enping and Raoping in Chaozhou

== In Germany ==
- Delta Radio (Lauenburg, Geesthacht and Schwarzenbek frequencies)

== In India ==
- Gyan Bharti

== In Indonesia ==
- Radio Paranti in Pandeglang, Indonesia

== In the Isle of Man ==
- 3FM (Ramsey frequency)

== In Italy ==
- Radio Antenna Borgetto (Borgetto)

== In Lithuania ==
- Ruskoje Radio Baltija

== In the United Kingdom ==
- Capital North East (Newcastle frequency)
- Capital Yorkshire (Bradford and Sheffield frequencies)
- Greatest Hits Radio Berkshire & North Hampshire (Newbury frequency)
- Greatest Hits Radio Cambridgeshire (Cambridge frequency)
- Greatest Hits Radio Somerset (Chard frequency)
- KMFM Maidstone
- Radio St Austell Bay
