= Culcha Candela =

German band

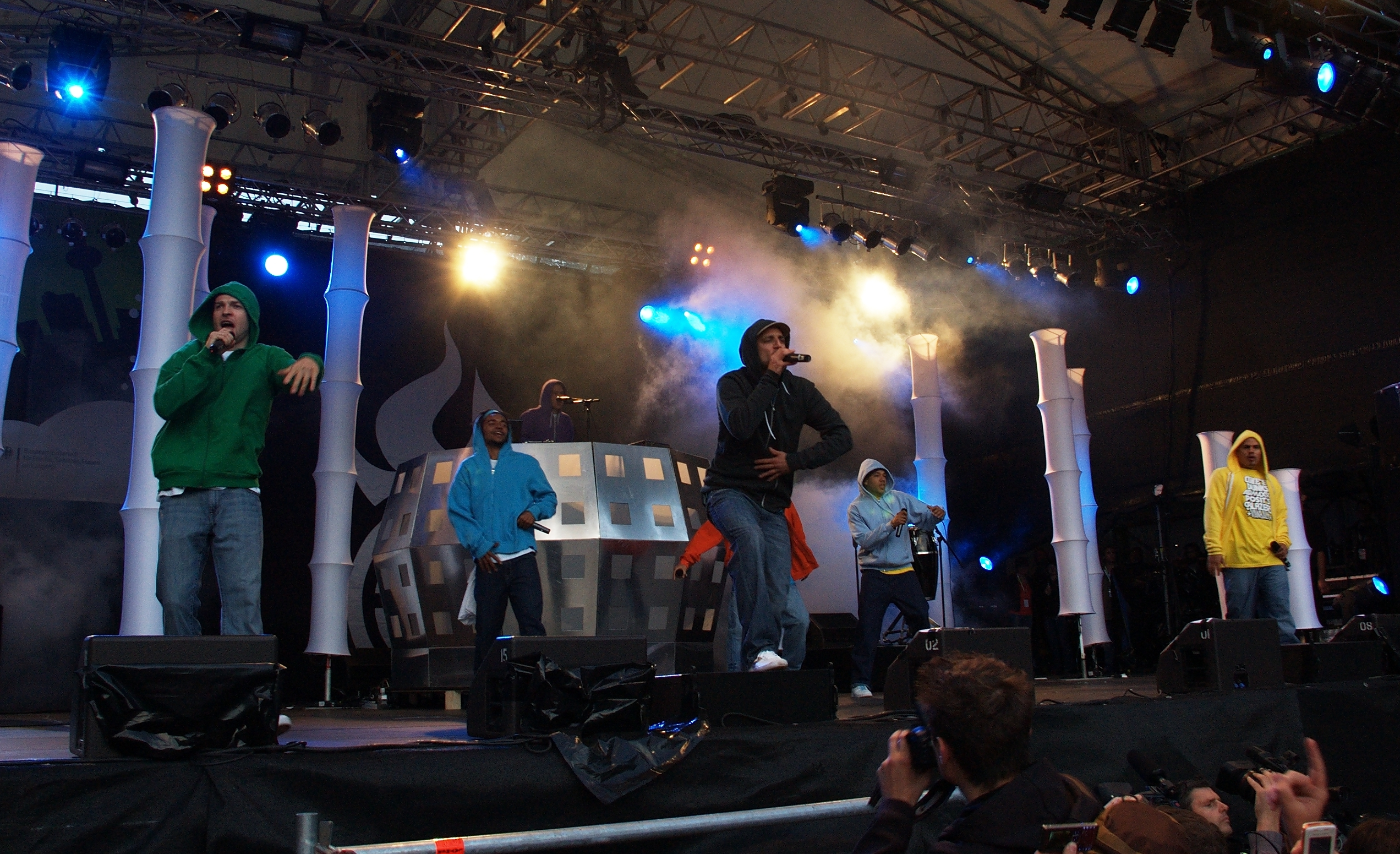
- Culcha Candela

Background information
- Origin: Berlin, Germany
- Genres: Dancehall; Pop; EDM; reggae; hip hop
- Years active: 2002–present
- Label: Universal Music Group
- Members: Johnny Strange, singer (Germany, Uganda) (founder); Itchyban, singer (Poland) (founder); Lafrotino, singer (Colombia) (founder); Larsito, singer (Germany with Colombian roots) (since 2002); Mr. Reedoo, singer (Germany) (since 2002); Don Cali, singer (Germany, Colombia) (since 2002); Chino con Estilo, DJ (Germany, Republic of Korea) (since 2002)
- Website: www.culchacandela.de

Culcha Candela is a dancehall, hip hop, house and reggae group from Berlin, Germany. Sources say they formed at different times but in the range of 2001–2003. Their lyrics range from political issues, such as "Una Cosa" or "Schöne, neue Welt" to party songs, such as "Partybus". The name Culcha Candela can be translated into English roughly as "hot" or "bright" culture.

== History ==
Culcha Candela themselves set their founding on 7 July 2002 through the band members Johnny Strange, Itchyban and Lafrotino. They were later joined by Larsito, Mr. Reedoo, Don Cali and DJ Chino. The different origin of the members is also reflected in the music so the band members rap and sing in English, German, Spanish and Patois. In the years after that, they performed numerous concerts, in 2004 the debut album Union Verdadera was released, reaching the German Charts.

The band toured together with Saïan Supa Crew, Gentleman and the Söhne Mannheims. In May 2005 they made a remix of "Siéntelo", the reggaeton hit of the Puerto Rican Speedy and the US-singer Lumidee. On 12 September 2005 their second album, Next Generation, was released, followed by their first tour of their own. Its style resembles that of the first one, with a strong reggae influence.

On 10 August 2007, their single "Hamma" was released. The pre-single from their third album, "Culcha Candela" was released on 31 August 2007.

In the following six weeks they were able to successfully defend first place in the single charts. "Hamma" later also went platinum A Hamma! Tour followed in German-speaking countries. The second single released from the album was Ey DJ on 23 November 2007.

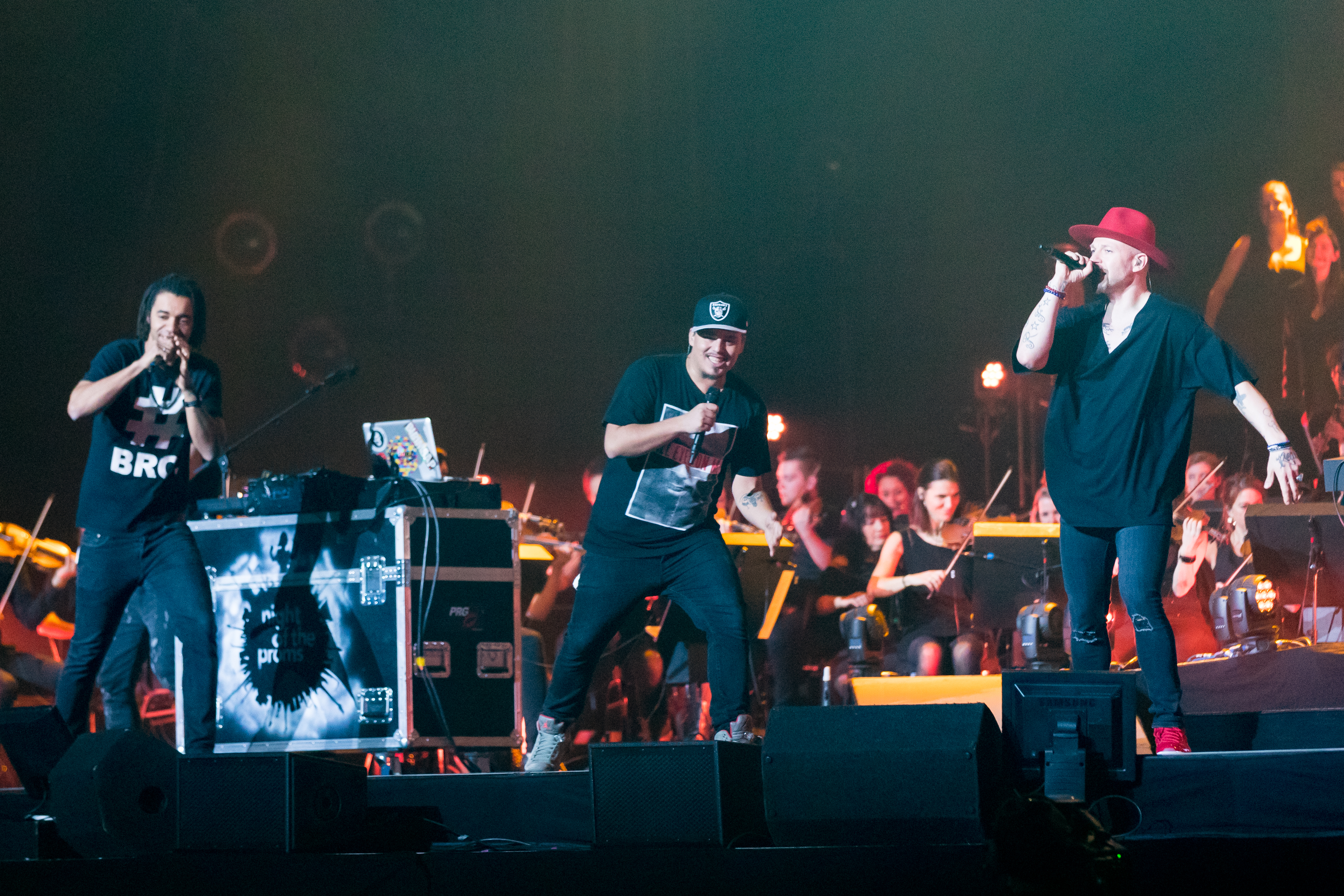
caption Culcha Candela bei den Night of the Proms 2017 in der SAP Arena in Mannheim

On 14 February 2008 the band represented their hometown Berlin with the song "Chica" at the Bundesvision Song Contest in the TUI Arena, in which they took seventh place.

On 28 August 2009 their fourth studio album was released, Schöne neue Welt, which went Platinum in Germany and Gold in Switzerland in 2011. The album stayed in the German charts for over a year. In terms of style, it was based on its predecessor: there are party songs, serious songs, but also two ballads on it. The first single was the song of the same name, "Schöne Neue Welt", which is about social, political development and environmental issues. The second single, "Monsta", was released on 22 October. It went gold in Germany and in Switzerland even platinum. The third single was "Eiskalt", which was released on 19 March 2010. In summer 2010 the fourth and final single, "Somma im Kiez", was released.

In November 2010 Culcha Candela went on tour in Central America for three weeks at the invitation of the Goethe-Institut. The same year, Lafrontino left the band.

On 22 October 2010 their first best-of album was released, Das Beste, which includes songs from their four studio albums, but also three new songs: "Move It", "Berlin City Girl" and "General". The first single released was "Move It" on 8 October, which rose to number 7 on the German charts. The second release, on 14 January 2011, was "Berlin City Girl"as a Wir Edition Remix.

On 27 May they performed in the König-Pilsener-Arena in Oberhausen at the VIVA Comet 2011 award ceremony and received the award in the Best Band category. After the award ceremony, they announced a new album for the end of the year, the first song of which they presented on their tour: "Hungry Eyes".

The single "Wildes Ding" was released on 6 January 2012. The "jungle version" of the song was the theme song for RTL - Dschungelcamp 2012. On 8 March 2012 they started their 15-concert Flätrate Tour with a concert in Dresden. Three weeks later they performed a final concert in their hometown Berlin in front of nearly 7000 fans.

At the end of 2012 they announced that they would take a break the following year. There would be no concerts and no new music would be released. Instead, they wanted to work on solo projects. Larsito offered drum workshops and recorded an album called Etwas bleibt, Johnny Strange got involved with the organization Afrika Rise, Don Cali produced as part of the project KAO Music, Chino and Itchy appeared as Itchinosound. In June 2014 Itchyban released his solo album Unperfekt under his real first name Mateo on the label Warner.

On 15 May 2014 Culcha Candela officially announced that Larsito and Mr. Reedoo had left the band and wanted to continue working solo. At the beginning of 2015, the four remaining band members also announced the change to Warner Music and the release of a new album together in summer 2015. On 1 May 2015 they released the song "La Noche Entera", which premiered as a pre-single exclusively on their Facebook page. On 5 June their first official single "Wayne" (feat. Curlyman) was released from the new album Candelistan, which was released on 28 August 2015.

In 2017, they released their seventh studio album, Feel Erfolg. This was followed in 2021 by Top Ten and in 2023 by Zu wahr um schön zu sein.

== Discography ==
=== Studio albums ===
Year	Title	Chart positions			Certifications
Year	Title	GER	AUT	SWI	Certifications
2004	Union Verdadera: Release: 20 September 2004 (GER)	52	—	—	
2005	Next Generation: Release: 12 September 2005 (GER)	20	73	—	
2007	Culcha Candela: Release: 31 August 2007 (GER)	6	35	23	BVMI: Platinum
2009	Schöne neue Welt: Release: 28 August 2009 (GER)	8	26	12	BVMI: Platinum; IFPI SWI: Gold
2011	Flätrate: Release: 25 November 2011 (GER)	15	44	25	BVMI: Gold
2015	Candelistan: Release: 28 August 2015 (GER)	11	19	15	
2017	Feel Erfolg: Release: 25 August 2017 (GER)	17	32	80	
2021	Top Ten: Release: 28 May 2021 (GER)	—	—	—	

=== Live albums ===
Year	Title	Chart positions		
Year	Title	GER	AUT	SWI
2008	Culcha Candela Live: Release: 25 July 2008 (GER)	—	59	67

=== Compilation albums ===
Year	Title	Chart positions			Certifications
Year	Title	GER	AUT	SWI	Certifications
2010	Das Beste: Release: 17 October 2010 (GER)	18	20	28	BVMI: Platinum
