= Elton.tv =

elton.tv was a German comedic late-night talk show hosted by Elton. It was originally shown once a week on ProSieben between 6 December 2001 and 27 March 2003.

The show was produced by Stefan Raab's company Raab TV and, in its original run, shown Thursdays after TV total. There were two seasons of the show, with about 50 episodes in total. Each episode of the show was about 30 minutes long and primarily featured Elton in studio talk with various German celebrity guests. Each episode also included Elton's street reports as well as his presentations of some interesting websites and video clips he found on the Internet.

Following the cancellation of the show on ProSieben, all of the episodes were repeated several times on VIVA until 2005.
