= Sophie Hunger =

Swiss musician and composer (born 1983)

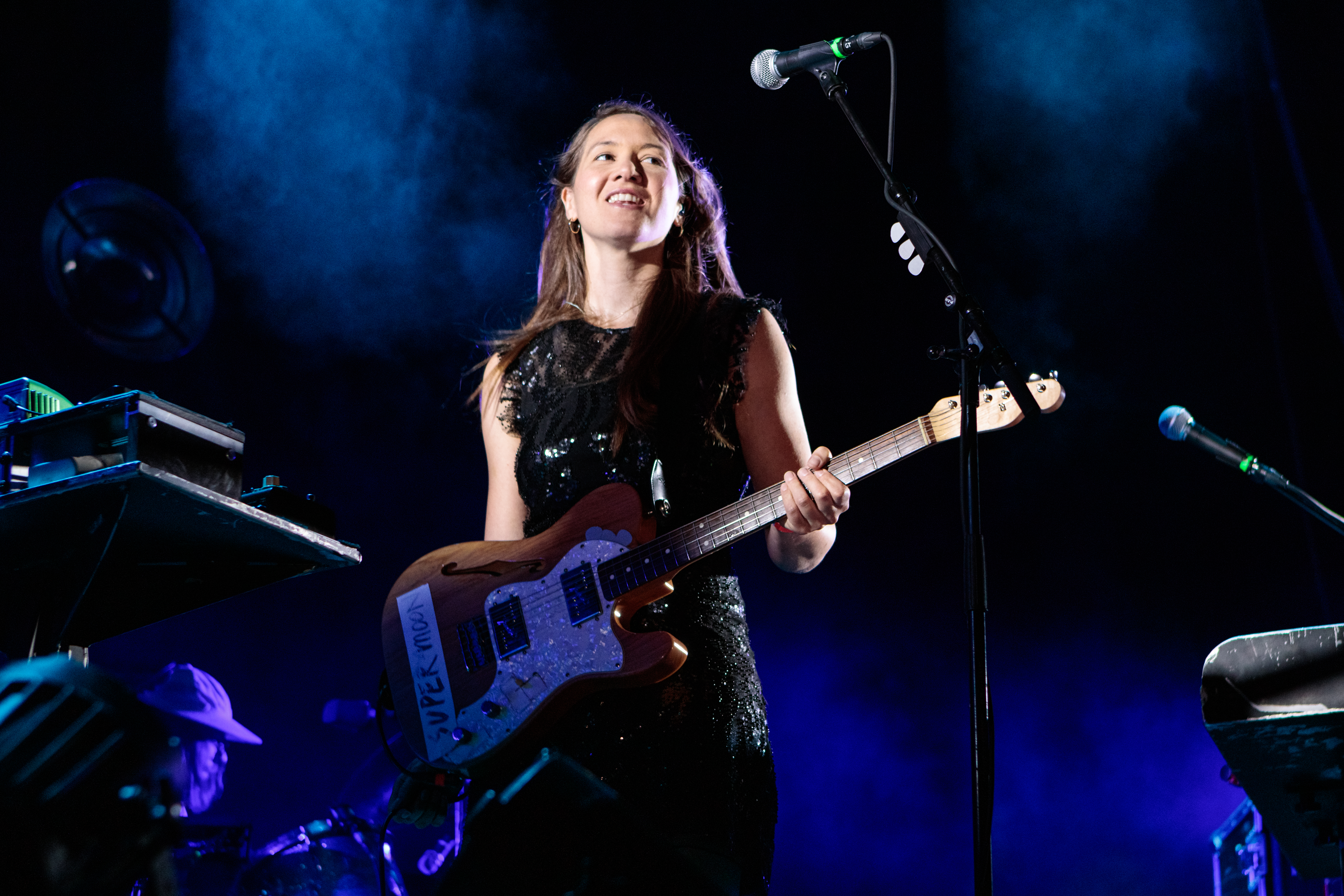
- Sophie Hunger at Haldern Pop Festival 2019

Background information
- Also known as: Emilie Welti
- Born: Émilie Jeanne-Sophie Welti; 31 March 1983 (age 43); Bern, Switzerland
- Origin: Zurich, Switzerland
- Genres: folk-pop-blues
- Occupations: Singer-songwriter, film composer
- Instruments: Voice, guitar, blues harp, piano
- Years active: 2002–present
- Labels: Two Gentlemen, Manimal
- Website: SophieHunger.com

Sophie Hunger (born Émilie Jeanne-Sophie Welti on 31 March 1983) is a Swiss singer-songwriter, film composer, multi-instrumentalist (guitar, blues harp, piano) and bandleader, currently living in Berlin.

== Early life ==
Émilie Jeanne-Sophie Welti was born on 31 March 1983 in Bern, Switzerland. She was a diplomat's daughter and grew up, with two older siblings, in Bern, London, Bonn and Zurich. She graduated high-school in 2002, then subsequently studied German and English.

While a child, Hunger took piano lessons for a time. She was familiar with jazz from an early age, since her father used to listen to it. Independently, she had a varying taste in music; as a teenager, she first was into hip-hop and R&B. Later she listened to rock – then, as a young adult, she discovered country, bluegrass and folk.

== Career ==
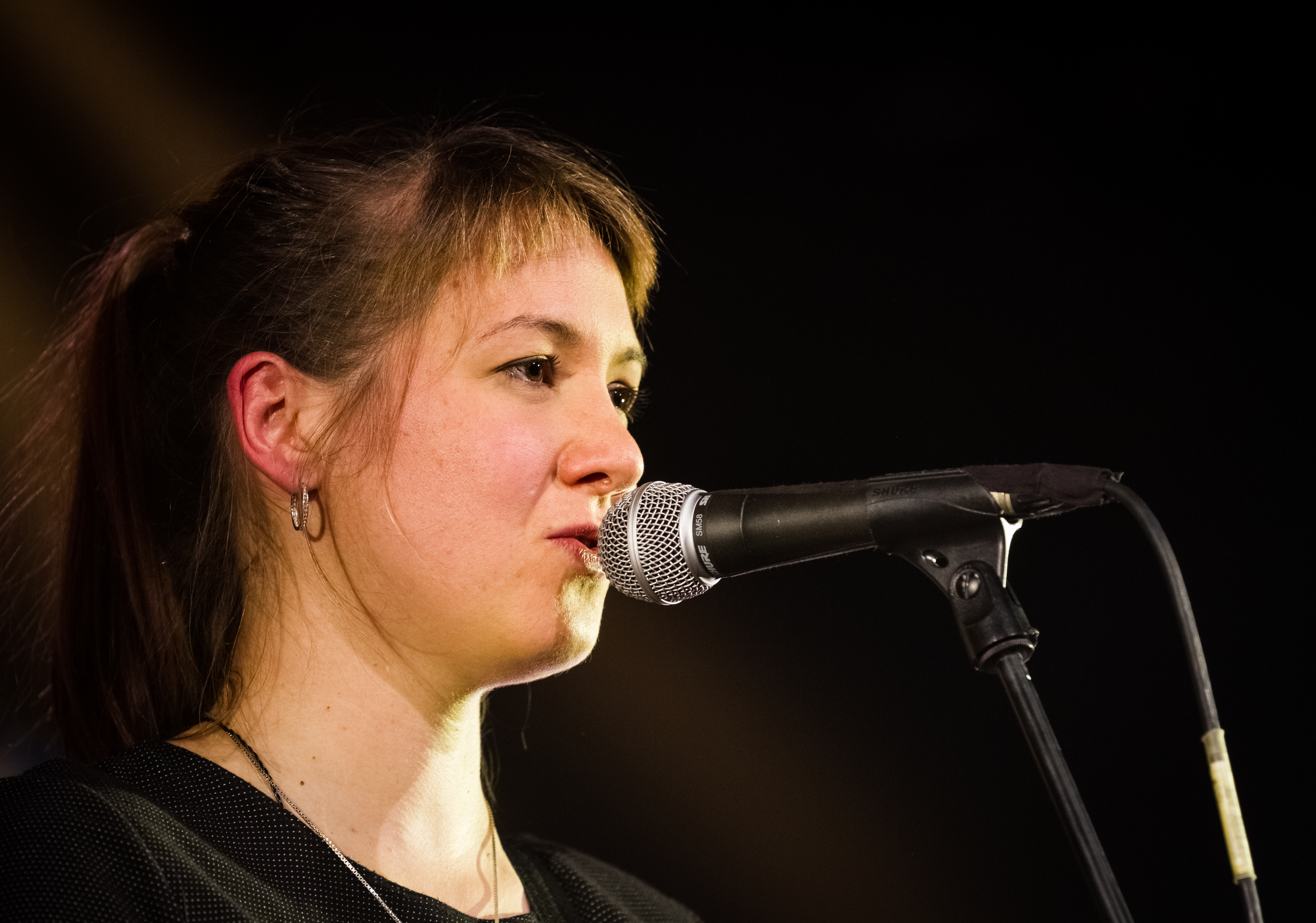
Sophie Hunger 2015

From 2002 to 2006, Hunger was a guest singer for the project Superterz and appears on the 2006 album Standards released by that group. Starting in 2004, Hunger was the lead singer of the indie rock group Fisher. The band split in 2007.

Hunger plays guitar, blues harp, piano and composes most of her songs in English, French, Swiss German, German and Swiss Italian. In 2006, in a few days, she home-recorded her solo début album, Sketches on Sea.

On 6 July 2008, Hunger and her band gave a concert in the Miles Davis Hall at the Montreux Jazz Festival, as well as Yael Naim and Camille. In July 2009, Hunger and her band closed out day 2 of TEDGlobal.

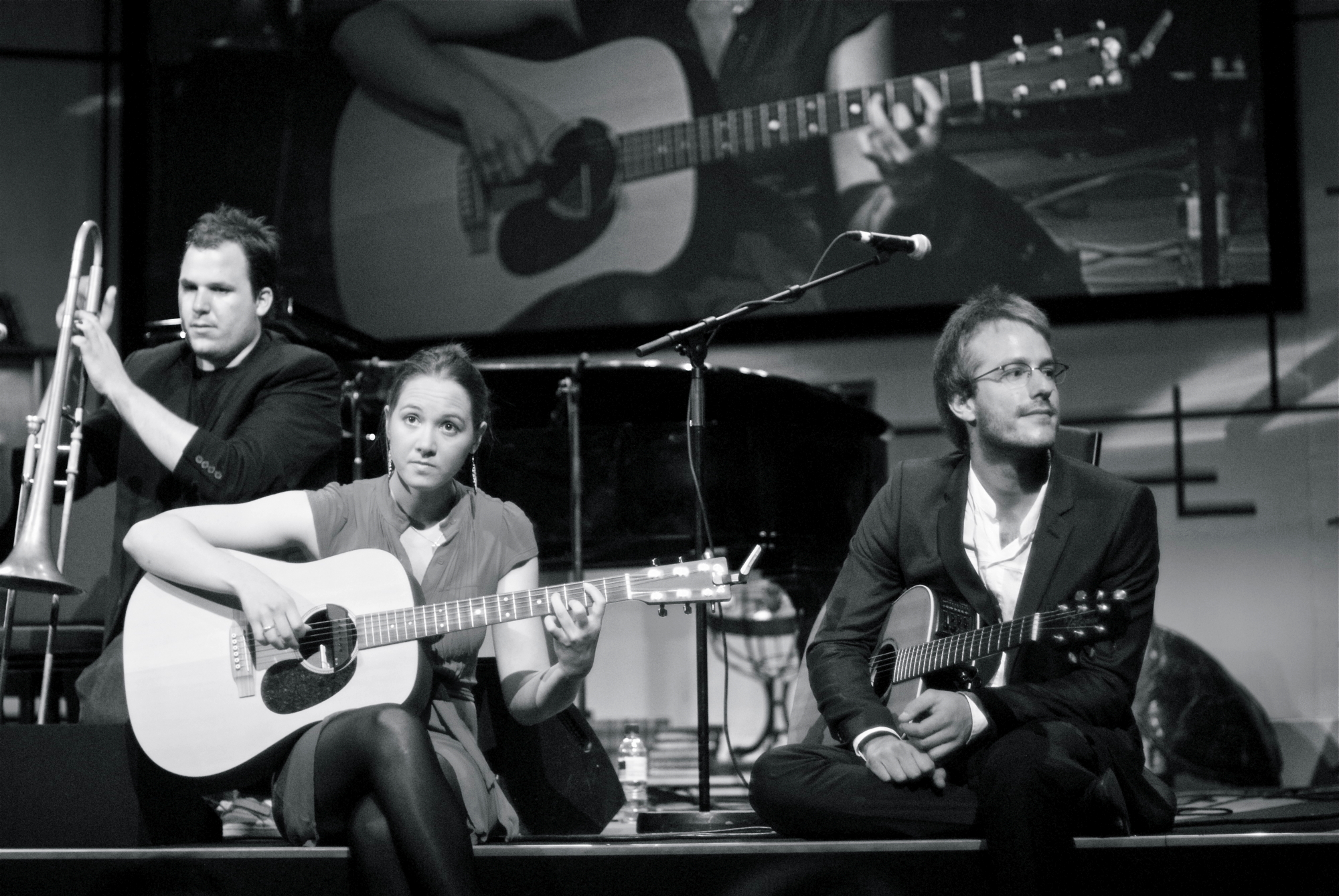
Sophie Hunger performing with her band at TEDGlobal in the United Kingdom on 22 July 2009

1983, her third album after Sketches At Sea and Monday's Ghost, released in early 2010. This album was described as being a further development of her own mix of genres exhibited on the previous two albums. In June 2010, Sophie Hunger and her band played the John Peel stage at Glastonbury Festival. Sophie Hunger was the first Swiss artist that has ever played there. In July 2010 she played at the 100 Club, London, in October 2010 at The Roundhouse, London. Later that year, it was announced that Sophie Hunger would release a début record for the North American market as Sophie Hunger: s/t on Manimal Vinyl in April 2011. The CD contained tracks from 1983 and Monday's Ghost.

In 2011, her version of Noir Désir's "Le vent nous portera", which first appeared on 1983, was featured in the film Café de Flore, directed by Jean-Marc Vallée.

In 2012, Hunger released her fourth Album, The Danger Of Light, which has been described to be influenced by jazz, or as changing between the genres folk, rock, pop and chansons.

She participated in the Bundesvision Song Contest 2013 as a featured artist on the song "Fremde" with rapper Max Herre. Representing the German state of Baden-Württemberg, they finished in eighth place with a total of 51 points. The song was included in a deluxe version of the 2012 German number-one album Hallo Welt!, in which Sophie also contributed vocals and lyrics to the song "Berlin - Tel Aviv".

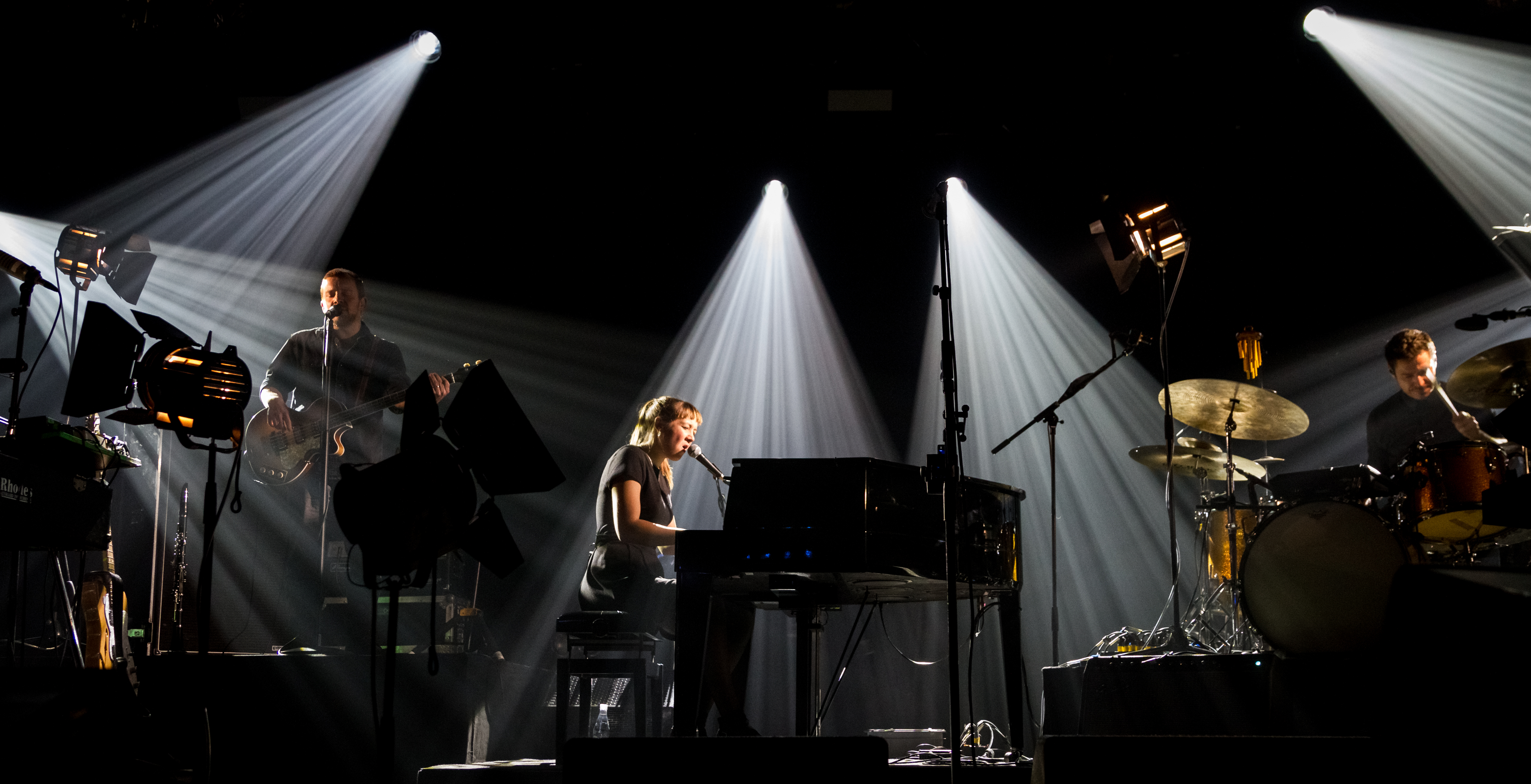
Sophie Hunger performing with her band at Leverkusener Jazztage 2015 in Germany

Supermoon, her fifth album, has been released in 2015. This album was described as alluding to the jazz roots from Hunger's first few albums, while mixing musical genres on every track.

In 2017 she made an appearance on the single "Song of I", a track from Steven Wilson's To the Bone.

On August 31, 2018, Molecules, Hunger's sixth album, was released. This album, being produced by Dan Carey, makes heavy use of synthesizers and other electronic instruments, and was described as a "fresh new start".

Continuing the cooperation with Carey, Hunger released her latest album, Halluzinationen (Hallucinations), in 2020. Having been recorded in two days at Abbey Road Studios, it was described as being "more versatile" than preceding works.

During the COVID-19 pandemic, Sophie Hunger and fellow Swiss artists Faber and Dino Brandão formed Brandão Faber Hunger, a supergroup to release a single album, Ich liebe Dich (I love You) in December 2020. It is an album of love songs exclusively sung in Swiss German.

== Discography ==
=== Studio albums ===
List of studio albums, with selected chart positions and certifications
| Year | Album | Peak positions | | | | | Certifications |
| Year | Album | SWI | AUT | BEL (Wa) | FRA | GER | Certifications |
|---|---|---|---|---|---|---|---|
| 2006 | Sketches on Sea | — | — | — | — | — | |
| 2008 | Monday's Ghost | 1 | — | — | 105 | — | IFPI SWI: Platinum |
| 2010 | 1983 | 1 | — | — | 87 | 62 | IFPI SWI: Gold |
| 2012 | The Danger of Light | 2 | 57 | — | 52 | 50 | |
| 2015 | Supermoon | 1 | 17 | 178 | 83 | 6 | |
| 2018 | Molecules | 2 | 21 | — | — | 16 | |
| 2020 | Halluzinationen | 1 | 31 | — | — | 11 | |
| 2020 | Ich Liebe Dich (as Brandão Faber Hunger with Dino Brandão & Faber) | 2 | 38 | — | — | 54 | |

=== Live albums ===
| Year | Album | Peak positions | |
| Year | Album | SWI | GER |
|---|---|---|---|
| 2013 | The Rules of Fire | 21 | 89 |

With the band Fisher, under the name Emilie Welti

- 2006: Fisher – Fisher (Kuenschtli.ch)
- 2006: Superterz: Standards

=== Singles ===
as Lead artist

| Year | Title | Peak positions | | | Album |
| Year | Title | BEL (Wa) | FRA | GER | Album |
|---|---|---|---|---|---|
| 2010 | "Le vent nous portera" | 20 | 154 | — | 1983 |
| 2013 | "Walzer für niemand" | — | — | 94 | Monday's Ghost |

as Featured artist

| Year | Title | Peak positions | Album |
| Year | Title | GER | Album |
|---|---|---|---|
| 2013 | "Fremde" (Max Herre featuring Sophie Hunger) | 32 | Hallo Welt! |

=== Soundtrack ===
as Emilie Welti

- 2008: Der Freund (with Marcel Vaid):
- 2010: Zimmer 202

as Sophie Hunger

- 2016: My Life as a Courgette

== Filmography ==
as Emilie Welti

- 2008: Der Freund
- 2012: Der Kumpel

as Sophie Hunger

- 2012: The Rules of Fire
- 2016: My Life as a Courgette

== Writings ==
- Hunger, Sophie (2025). Walzer für Niemand: Roman (in German). Köln: Kiepenheuer & Witsch Verlag. ISBN 978-3-462-00324-6.

== Awards and nominations ==
| Organisation | Year | Category | Nominated work | Result | Ref. |
|---|---|---|---|---|---|
| SwissAwards | 2010 | Best Show | Herself | Won | |
| Swiss Music Awards | 2016 | Artist Award | Herself | Won | |
| Swiss Music Awards | 2016 | Best Female Solo Act | Herself | Nominated | |
| Swiss Grand Award for Music | 2016 | Swiss Grand Prix | Herself | Won | |
| Lumière Awards | 2017 | Best Music | My Life as a Courgette | Nominated | |
| César Award | 2017 | Best Original Music | My Life as a Courgette | Nominated | |
| Swiss Film Award | 2017 | Best Music | My Life as a Courgette | Won | |
| Award for Pop Culture | 2019 | Favourite Female Solo Artist | Molecules | Won | |
| Deutscher Fernsehpreis | 2020 | Best Music | Rampensau | Won | |
