= Bundesvision Song Contest 2007 =

German music competition

Date and venue
- Final: 9 February 2007
- Venue: Tempodrom, Berlin

Organisation
- Presenters: Stefan Raab; Johanna Klum; Elton (green room)
- Participation map: Legend; 1st place 2nd place 3rd place 4th place 5th place 6th place 7th place 8th place 9th place 10th place 11th place 12th place 13th place 14th place 15th place 16th place

Vote
- Voting system: Each state awards 12, 10, 8–1 points to their top 10 songs.
- Winning song: Lower Saxony "Träumst du?" by Oomph! feat. Marta Jandová

The Bundesvision Song Contest 2007 was the third edition of the annual televised Bundesvision Song Contest, a German reality singing contest. The contest was held on 9 February 2007 at the Tempodrom in Berlin, following Seeed's win in the 2006 contest in Hesse with the song "Ding." The contest was hosted by Stefan Raab, Johanna Klum, and Elton in the green room.

== Contest overview ==
The participants were announced by ProSieben on 28 November 2006. On 15 January 2007, Stefan Raab began presenting each participant and their state on his show TV total for four weeks.

The contest was originally to take place on Saturday 10 February, but was brought forward by a day so to not clash with Deutschland sucht den Superstar.

For the first time, all participants were, with one exception (the band Beatplanet), from the states they represented. Returning artists include: Marta Jandová (2005; with Apocalyptica), and Suzie Kerstgens (2005; member from Klee). Both representing different states than their first participation in 2005.

The winner of the Bundesvision Song Contest 2007 was Oomph! feat. Marta Jandová with the song "Träumst du?," representing Lower Saxony. In second place was Jan Delay representing Hamburg, and third place to Kim Frank representing Schleswig-Holstein.

14 of the 16 states awarded themselves the maximum of 12 points, with Brandenburg, and Rhineland-Palatinate, awarding themselves 10 points each.

The contest was broadcast by ProSieben and watched by 2.04 million people (7.6% market share). In the 14-49 age range 1.72 million people watched the contest (16.3% market share).

== Results ==
Bundesvision Song Contest 2007
| R/O | State | Artist | Song | English translation | Radio station | Points | Place |
|---|---|---|---|---|---|---|---|
| 1 | Berlin | MIA. | "Zirkus" | Circus | Energy Berlin | 96 | 4 |
| 2 | Hesse | D-Flame | "Mom Song" | — | SkyRadio | 67 | 7 |
| 3 | Mecklenburg-Vorpommern | Melotron | "Das Herz" | The heart | Antenne MV | 13 | 13 |
| 4 | Saxony | Manja | "Es ist die Liebe" | It's the love | Sächsische Lokalradios | 13 | 13 |
| 5 | Saxony-Anhalt | Jenna+Ron | "Jung und willig" | Young and willing | Radio Brocken | 56 | 8 |
| 6 | Saarland | B-Stinged Butterfly | "Liebe" | Love | Radio Salü | 17 | 12 |
| 7 | Brandenburg | Beatplanet | "Dreh dich um und geh" | Turn around and leave | KenFM | 11 | 15 |
| 8 | North Rhine-Westphalia | Pohlmann | "Mädchen und Rabauken" | Girls and roughnecks | Radio NRW | 95 | 5 |
| 9 | Rhineland-Palatinate | Kalle feat. M.A.R.S. Allstars | "Aber Nice" | But nice | bigFM | 10 | 16 |
| 10 | Bavaria | Anajo & Suzie Kerstgens | "Wenn du nur wüsstest" | If you only knew | Energy | 33 | 9 |
| 11 | Lower Saxony | Oomph! feat. Marta Jandová | "Träumst du?" | Are you dreaming? | radio ffn | 147 | 1 |
| 12 | Baden-Württemberg | Tele | "Mario" | — | bigFM | 23 | 10 |
| 13 | Bremen | Lea Finn | "Ich weiß und du weißt" | I know and you know | Energy Bremen | 20 | 11 |
| 14 | Schleswig-Holstein | Kim Frank | "Lara" | — | delta radio | 101 | 3 |
| 15 | Thuringia | Northern Lite feat. Chapeau Claque | "Enemy" | — | Radio Top 40 | 88 | 6 |
| 16 | Hamburg | Jan Delay | "Feuer" | Fire | Radio Hamburg | 138 | 2 |

== Scoreboard ==
| | Voting results | | | | | | | | | | | | | | | | |
|---|---|---|---|---|---|---|---|---|---|---|---|---|---|---|---|---|---|
| Berlin | 96 | 12 | 6 | 5 | 6 | 4 | 12 | 6 | 4 | 5 | 4 | 3 | 4 | 6 | 6 | 8 | 5 |
| Hesse | 67 | 2 | 12 | 2 | 2 | 3 | 1 | 5 | 7 | 4 | 7 | 4 | 3 | 5 | 4 | 3 | 3 |
| Mecklenburg-Vorpommern | 13 | | | 12 | 1 | | | | | | | | | | | | |
| Saxony | 13 | | | | 12 | | | | | | | 1 | | | | | |
| Saxony-Anhalt | 56 | 4 | 3 | 3 | 4 | 1 | 3 | 4 | 2 | 3 | 2 | 2 | 2 | 4 | 3 | 4 | 12 |
| Saarland | 17 | | 1 | | | 12 | | | 3 | | | | | | | 1 | |
| Brandenburg | 11 | 1 | | | | | 10 | | | | | | | | | | |
| North Rhine-Westphalia | 95 | 3 | 7 | 4 | 3 | 6 | 4 | 12 | 6 | 8 | 6 | 7 | 6 | 7 | 7 | 5 | 4 |
| Rhineland-Palatinate | 10 | | | | | | | | 10 | | | | | | | | |
| Bavaria | 33 | | 2 | 1 | | 7 | 2 | 2 | | 1 | 1 | | 12 | | 1 | 2 | 2 |
| Lower Saxony | 147 | 8 | 10 | 6 | 8 | 10 | 7 | 10 | 12 | 12 | 10 | 8 | 10 | 8 | 8 | 10 | 10 |
| Baden-Württemberg | 23 | 5 | | | | | | | | | 12 | | 1 | 2 | 2 | | 1 |
| Bremen | 20 | | | | | | | 1 | | 6 | | 12 | | 1 | | | |
| Schleswig-Holstein | 101 | 6 | 5 | 7 | 5 | 5 | 5 | 7 | 5 | 7 | 5 | 5 | 5 | 12 | 10 | 6 | 6 |
| Thuringia | 88 | 7 | 4 | 8 | 10 | 2 | 8 | 3 | 1 | 2 | 3 | 6 | 7 | 3 | 5 | 12 | 7 |
| Hamburg | 138 | 10 | 8 | 10 | 7 | 8 | 6 | 8 | 8 | 10 | 8 | 10 | 8 | 10 | 12 | 7 | 8 |

== Spokespersons ==
- Berlin – Söhnlein B.
- Hesse – Nadja Gontermann and Nicolas Sawatzki
- Mecklenburg-Vorpommern – Dirk Steigemann and Kathrin Feistner
- Saxony – André Hardt
- Saarland – Martina Straten and Tom Sörens
- Brandenburg – Ken Jebsen
- North Rhine-Westphalia – Claudia Barbonus
- Rhineland-Palatinate – Hans Blomberg
- Lower Saxony – Frank Schambor and Susan Hammann
- Baden-Württemberg – Jonathan Schächter
- Bremen – Judith Hildebrandt
- Bavaria – Bene Gutjan & Schummi
- Schleswig-Holstein – Danny Peters and Kaya Laß
- Hamburg – Christian Aust
- Thuringia – Tommi
- Saxony-Anhalt – Thomas Schminke and Katja Feller
