= The Love Bülow =

- Genres: Indie Rap
- Years active: 2008 - Present
- Labels: MaM Records
- Members: Jakob Unger (keys, vocals); Golo Schmiedt (drums, vocals); Falk-Arne Goßler (vocals/lyrics); Juri Westermann (bass); Michél Kollar (guitar, vocals)
- Website: http://thelovebuelow.de

The Love Bülow is an Indie Rap band from Berlin, created in 2008. Their music is a combination of singing, Rap lyrics, Rock, Funk and Hip Hop beats.

Their first EP, Menschen sind wie Lieder, was presented in June 2009 by Radio Fritz (RBB) and the following album was officially released on 4 March 2011 on the German, Berlin-based music label MaM Records. The album reached No. 2 of the Amazon mp3 charts Hip Hop/Rap and No. 90 of all Amazon charts.

Together with MaM Records The Love Bülow also released 3 singles (Lieblingslied, Du Schweigst and Los!).

In the summer of 2009, The Love Bülow won the Berlin contest „So Klingt Berlin“ and received the award "Best Hip Hop Act". In March 2010 they won Styles and Skills, another important Berlin band contest. In September 2010 The Love Bülow were voted to the "Myspace Featured Artist Of The Month" and made a tour around Germany as a support for the German Rap artist F.R.. After being voted to the "Newcomer Of The Year" at the German contest Local Heroes in November 2010, The Love Bülow went to Hungary to represent Germany in the "Local Heroes European Finals" Yourope .

Amongst several festivals, The Love Bülow performed together with Scooter in front of 5,000 spectators at the Obi-Arena Rheine in July 2011.

On 8 October 2011, The Love Bülow performed at the German TV show Inas Nacht (ARD/NDR), which was viewed by 1,46 million TV spectators. Since then the band has been in the public eye.

The Love Bülow also received very positive reviews by several music media such as Piranha, Triggerfish and JMC Magazin.

== Discography ==
1. Single - "Los!" released on: 09/16/11 - digital / 2 tracks
2. Debut album "Menschen sind wie Lieder" - released on: 03/04/11 - digital / physical / 13 tracks
3. Single - "Du schweigst" (radio edit) - released on: 02/18/11 - digital / 2 tracks
4. Single - "Lieblingslied" - released on: 11/05/10
5. EP - "Menschen sind wie Lieder" - released on: 06/15/09 - physical / 5 tracks

== Videos ==
1. Du schweigst
2. Los!
3. Lieblingslied
4. The Love Bülow Zu Gast bei Inas Nacht
5. Schall und Rauch
