= Jupiter Jones (band) =

German boy band

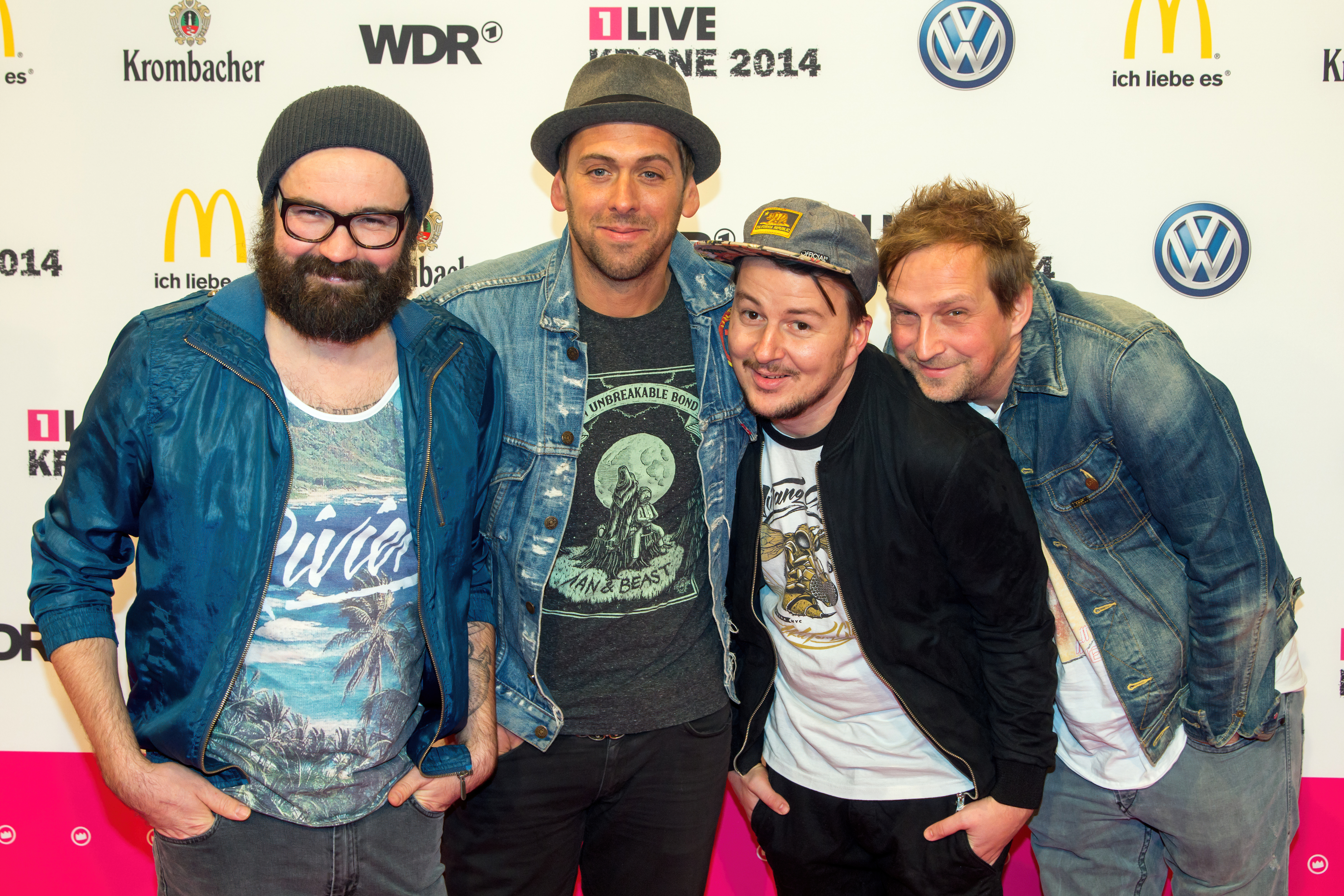
- Jupiter Jones at 1LIVE Krone, 2014.

Background information
- Origin: Germany, Eifel
- Genres: Punk rock; indie pop; pop
- Years active: 2002–2018; 2021
- Members: Nicholas Müller; Sascha Eigner
- Past members: Marco Hontheim (Hont); Klaus Hoffmann (Klaus Jones); Svaen Lauer; Michael Stadtfeld; Andreas Becker (Becks)

Jupiter Jones is a German band from the Eifel region, who became popular through their song “Still”, which also won them the German Echo Pop award.

== History ==
Founded in autumn 2002 at a party in Eifel, the band named themselves after the adolescent detective Jupiter Jones (German Justus Jonas), from the English-language original version of the book and radio play series Three Investigators. Their lyrics are usually in German. Jupiter Jones publishes through their own label, Mathilda's and Titus' Tonträger ("Mathildas und Titus phonogram"), which is also named after characters from Three Investigators.

Their first demo Auf das Leben ("A cheer to life"), was produced and available for download in the same year the band was founded. Subsequently, they played as opening acts for Muff Potter, die Donots and the (International) Noise Conspiracy. In November 2003, they won second place at the Rockbuster Newcomercontest of Rhineland-Palatinate, represented by the SWR radio station “Dasding”. Jupiter Jones played their first official concert in 2004 at the Southside Festival. Their debut album Raum um Raum (Room by Room) was published in October 2004, with the single Reiss die Trauer aus den Büchern ("Rip the grief from the books") being voted to first place of the newcomer broadcast Netzparade, a program introducing new hits on the radio station Dasding.

The second album Entweder geht diese scheussliche Tapete – oder ich ("Either this terrible wallpaper goes – Or I do") was published in 2007. In cooperation with the Goethe-Institut, Jupiter Jones then went on a ten-day tour through Bulgaria in the same year. In the following year, they performed at a festival in Ankara in front of an audience of approximately 7,000 and played an Unplugged concert in the Capuchin monastery Cochem, which was published as a DVD as well as an album under the name …leise ("… quiet"). 2009 the band took part as talents in the funding of the Volkswagen Sound Foundation, and are part of the so-called Sound Foundation Family ever since. In the same year they published their third album “Holiday in Catatonia”, featuring Jana Pallaske as a guest singer.

In August 2010 the band signed a contract with Cumbia Berlin (Sony). However, their own label Mathildas und Titus Tonträger remains involved as a label. The first album on the new label was released on 25 February 2011 under the title Jupiter Jones and contains twelve tracks, including the single release Still, which was released as a CD on 4 March, but had already been shown on the band's website in two versions as a video (original video and live acoustic performance on ARD). There is also an official music video for Still, and in April 2011 Jupiter Jones performed the song in an episode of Hand aufs Herz. Still became the most played German-language song on German radio in April 2011 and remained so for entire year.

In May and June 2011, the band performed at the Schlossgrabenfest in Darmstadt and at the Hurricane and Southside festivals, and on 15 June 2011, the group sang and played their song Immer für immer ("Ever forever") live on Sat.1-Frühstücksfernsehen (a German Breakfast TV show), which they also presented on 1 July 2011 in the program on tape on ZDFkultur and had already performed for the Radio Bremen program Buten un Binnen on 12 March 2011. On 29 September 2011, they performed the song at the Bundesvision Song Contest for Rhineland-Palatinate and took sixth place.

On 5 October 2012, a Dutch cover version of the song Still by the Zeeland band Bløf was released in the Netherlands under the name Zo stil. The cover version reached number 14 in the Dutch charts.

In October 2013, Jupiter Jones released their sixth album Das Gegenteil von Allem ("the opposite of everything"). The song Rennen + Stolpern ("running + stumbling") was released as the first single on 27 September 2013 and entered the charts on 11 October 2013. The release of the new album was to be accompanied by the Das-Gegenteil-von-Allem-Tour 2014 from 7 March 2014 to 26 April 2014. However, on 3 March, all concerts were cancelled as singer Nicholas Müller was suffering from anxiety disorders. On 14 May 2014, the group announced on Facebook that the band would continue with a new singer due to Müller's illness. A friend of the band, Svaen Lauer from Caracho, was introduced as the new singer.

In July 2014, the live album Glory.Glory.Halleluyah which includes all previous titles was released. This album was recorded with their previous singer, Nicolas Müller. Furthermore, the first single with Lauer as the new vocalist, as well as plans for a new album were announced for Summer 2014.

With their song Plötzlich hält die Welt an (Suddenly, the world stops), Jupiter Jones represented Rhineland-Palatinate once again at the Bundesvision Song Contest 2014 and achieved second place this time.

Every year, the band held a summer concert and an end-of-the-year concert. Usually, the summer concerts were held Trier in the ExHaus while the end-of-the-year concerts were held in Cologne in various venues like the Gloria-Theater or the Live Music Hall. Newcomers such as The Bandgeek Mafia were given the opportunity to perform in front of a larger audience.

In November 2017, the band announced their disbanding. However, several concerts were still supposed to take place. They played their last festival gig in 19 August 2018 at the Karben Open Air Festival in Karben. Their last concert was played on 1 September 2018.

Hont, who was the drummer, became a member of the black metal band Desaster. Klaus Hoffman joined the Band Trixsi, a German indie rock band.

After he left the band, the former vocalist Nicholas Müller was performing with Tobias Schmitz as von Brücken, a German indie pop band from 2015 to 2019. In 2021 the reunion of Jupiter Jones took place. Since then, only Nicolas Müller and Sasche Eigner are official band members that are accompanied by musicians who are their friends when performing live.

On January 29, 2021, Überall waren Schatten ("Shadows were everywhere") was released as the first single since the comeback. The album Die Sonne ist ein Zwergstern (the sun is a dwarf star) was financed via crowdfunding and released on 30 December 2022.

In 2021, the band supported a petition by the citizens of Trier to revive Trier's youth center.

== Discography ==
=== Albums ===
Year	Title	Label
2004	Raum um Raum	Go-Kart Records (SMD)
2007	Entweder geht diese scheußliche Tapete – oder ich	Mathildas und Titus Tonträger (BSID)
2009	Holiday in Catatonia	Mathildas und Titus Tonträger (BSID)
2011	Jupiter Jones	Four Music (Sony)
2013	Das Gegenteil von Allem	Four Music (Sony)
2016	Brüllende Fahnen	Four Music (Sony)
2022	Die Sonne ist ein Zwergstern	Mathildas und Titus Tonträger (RTR)

== Awards ==
- 2012: Echo Pop in the category Radio-ECHO ("Still")
