= Bundesvision Song Contest 2010 =

German music competition

Date and venue
- Final: 1 October 2010
- Venue: Max-Schmeling-Halle, Berlin

Organisation
- Presenters: Stefan Raab; Johanna Klum; Elton (green room)
- Participation map: Legend; 1st place 2nd place 3rd place 4th place 5th place 6th place 7th place 8th place 9th place 10th place 11th place 12th place 13th place 14th place 15th place 16th place

Vote
- Voting system: Each state awards 12, 10, 8–1 points to their top 10 songs.
- Winning song: North Rhine-Westphalia "Unter deiner Flagge" by Unheilig

The Bundesvision Song Contest 2010 was the sixth edition of the annual Bundesvision Song Contest musical event. The contest was held on 1 October 2010 at the Max-Schmeling-Halle, Berlin, following Peter Fox's win in the 2009 contest in Brandenburg with the song "Schwarz zu blau". This was the second time that Berlin had hosted the contest, after previously hosting in 2007. The contest was hosted by Stefan Raab, Johanna Klum, and Elton in the green room.

== Contest overview ==
The participants were announced online on the TV total website on 31 May 2010, the Monday after the Eurovision Song Contest 2010 in which Germany had won with help from Stefan Raab's involvement in their national selection, Unser Star für Oslo.

The winner of the Bundesvision Song Contest 2010 was Unheilig with the song "Unter deiner Flagge", representing North Rhine-Westphalia. In second place was Silly representing Saxony-Anhalt, and third place to Ich + Ich feat. Mohamed Mounir representing Berlin. Unheilig, and Silly formed a leading group from the start of voting, that lasted until the end, with the two bands being separated by 12 points, and over 50 points separating them from third place. Many of Silly's highest points came from the new states of Germany (including Berlin) from the former East Germany, due to the band's popularity, they also received the highest ever score for runner-up, earning more points than winning artists from 2006 to 2008.

9 of the 16 states awarded themselves the maximum of 12 points, with Baden-Württemberg, Berlin, Brandenburg, Hesse, Lower Saxony, Rhineland-Palatinate, and Saxony awarding themselves 10, 10, 8, 10, 4, 10, and 8 points respectively.

It is worth noting that the entry representing Lower Saxony, "So geht das jede Nacht," was in fact a cover of one of the first German entries at the Eurovision Song Contest. It was performed originally by Freddy Quinn as the second of Germany's two entries at the first-ever contest in 1956.

== Results ==
Bundesvision Song Contest 2010
R/O	State	Artist	Song	English translation	Points	Place
1	Hamburg	Selig	"Von Ewigkeit zu Ewigkeit"	From eternity to eternity	40	8
2	Rhineland-Palatinate	Auletta	"Sommerdiebe"	Summer thieves	17	14
3	Saxony	Blockflöte des Todes & Diane Weigmann	"Alles wird teurer"	Everything gets more expensive	20	11
4	Bremen	Kleinstadthelden	"Indie Boys"	—	20	11
5	Mecklenburg-Vorpommern	Sebastian Hämer	"Is' schon ok"	It's okay	22	10
6	Lower Saxony	Bernd Begemann & Dirk Darmstaedter	"So geht das jede Nacht"	That's how it is every night	4	16
7	Brandenburg	Das Gezeichnete Ich	"Du, Es und Ich"	You, it and me	87	5
8	Schleswig-Holstein	Stanfour feat. Itchino Sound	"Sail On"	—	60	7
9	Hesse	Oceana & Leon Taylor	"Far Away"	—	18	13
10	Saarland	Mikroboy	"Nichts ist umsonst"	Nothing's for free	12	15
11	Thuringia	Norman Sinn & Ryo	"Planlos"	Aimless	79	6
12	Bavaria	Blumentopf	"SoLaLa"	So-so	94	4
13	Saxony-Anhalt	Silly	"Alles Rot"	Everything red	152	2
14	Baden-Württemberg	Bakkushan	"Springwut"	Jump furor	39	9
15	Berlin	Ich + Ich feat. Mohamed Mounir	"Yasmine"	—	100	3
16	North Rhine-Westphalia	Unheilig	"Unter deiner Flagge"	Under your flag	164	1

== Scoreboard ==
	Voting results																
Hamburg	40	12		2	3	3	2	3	7						1	3	4
Rhineland-Palatinate	17		10							6	1						
Saxony	20			8		1						3	2	2		4	
Bremen	20				12		8										
Mecklenburg-Vorpommern	22					12		2	1			2		3		2	
Lower Saxony	4						4										
Brandenburg	87	6	3	6	4	6	5	8	4	3	4	7	5	8	5	7	6
Schleswig-Holstein	60	5	4	3	1	4	3	6	12	1	2	4	3	4	3		5
Hesse	18	2	2							10			1		2		1
Saarland	12										12						
Thuringia	79	7	1	5	7	5		4	3	4	7	12	6	6	4	5	3
Bavaria	94	4	5	4	6	2	7	5	6	7	6	5	12	5	7	6	7
Saxony-Anhalt	152	8	8	12	8	10	10	12	8	8	8	10	8	12	8	12	10
Baden-Württemberg	39	1	7	1	2		1	1	2	2	3	1	4	1	10	1	2
Berlin	100	3	6	7	5	7	6	7	5	5	5	6	7	7	6	10	8
North Rhine-Westphalia	164	10	12	10	10	8	12	10	10	12	10	8	10	10	12	8	12
