= Bundesvision Song Contest 2008 =

German music competition

Date and venue
- Final: 14 February 2008
- Venue: TUI Arena, Hanover, Lower Saxony

Organisation
- Presenters: Stefan Raab; Johanna Klum; Elton
- Participation map: Legend; 1st place 2nd place 3rd place 4th place 5th place 6th place 7th place 8th place 9th place 10th place 11th place 12th place 13th place 14th place 15th place 16th place

Vote
- Voting system: Each state awards 12, 10, 8–1 point(s) to their top 10 songs.
- Winning song: Brandenburg "Auf Kiel" by Subway to Sally

The Bundesvision Song Contest 2008 was the fourth edition of the annual Bundesvision Song Contest musical event. The contest was held on 14 February 2008 at the TUI Arena in Hanover, Lower Saxony, following Oomph! feat. Marta Jandová's win in the 2007 contest in Berlin with the song "Träumst du?". The show was hosted by Stefan Raab, Johanna Klum, and Elton in the green room.

At the beginning of the contest, the Minister President of Lower Saxony Christian Wulff was welcomed into the arena and presented as a "patron" of the contest.

== Contest overview ==
The participants and their states were announced between 21 January and 13 February 2008 on TV total.

The winner of the Bundesvision Song Contest 2008 was Subway to Sally with the song "Auf Kiel", representing Brandenburg. In second place was Clueso representing Thuringia, and third place to Down Below representing Saxony-Anhalt.

Returning artists include: Clueso who participated for Thuringia for a second time after the 2005 contest. Peter Brugger returns as a member of Sportfreunde Stiller, having previously appeared in the band TipTop in 2006, both for Bavaria. Mamadee, who took part in 2005 with Gentleman, returns as part of the band Sisters, both for North Rhine-Westphalia. Favourites, established groups, and artists such as Sportfreunde Stiller, Laith Al-Deen, and Culcha Candela did not fare well compared to many newcomers to the contest.

15 of the 16 states awarded themselves the maximum of 12 points, with North Rhine-Westphalia awarding themselves 10 points.

The contest was broadcast by ProSieben and watched by 1.58 million people (8% market share). In the 14–49 age range 1.31 million people watched the contest (15% market share). Since the first competition in 2005, the number of viewers has fallen continuously, but the market share has increased from 7.6% in 2007, to 8% in 2008.

On 29 February 2008, 12 of the 16 songs placed in the top 100 of the German charts, with eight in the top 50. Clueso, and Das Bo's songs went straight to numbers 15 and 16 respectively.

== Results ==
Bundesvision Song Contest 2008
| R/O | State | Artist | Song | English translation | Radio station | Points | Place |
|---|---|---|---|---|---|---|---|
| 1 | Hamburg | Das Bo | "Ohne Bo" | Without Bo | Energy Hamburg | 19 | 12 |
| 2 | Mecklenburg-Vorpommern | Jennifer Rostock | "Kopf oder Zahl" | Heads or tails | Antenne MV | 79 | 5 |
| 3 | Hesse | Rapsoul | "König der Welt" | King of the world | Hit Radio FFH | 51 | 8 |
| 4 | Saarland | Casino Zero | "Gib mir einen Blick" | Give me a look | Radio Salü | 12 | 15 |
| 5 | Saxony | Far East Band feat. Dean Dawson | "Unfassbar" | Unfathomably | Leipzig 91 Punkt 3 | 12 | 15 |
| 6 | Saxony-Anhalt | Down Below | "Sand in meiner Hand" | Sand in my hand | Rockland | 96 | 3 |
| 7 | Bremen | Paulsrekorder | "Anna" | — | Energy Bremen | 20 | 11 |
| 8 | Schleswig-Holstein | Panik | "Was würdest du tun?" | What would you do? | Radio Flensburg | 75 | 6 |
| 9 | Brandenburg | Subway to Sally | "Auf Kiel" | On keel | 94.5 Radio Cottbus | 147 | 1 |
| 10 | North Rhine-Westphalia | Sisters | "Unite" | — | Radio NRW | 16 | 14 |
| 11 | Rhineland-Palatinate | Peilomat | "Jenny" | — | RPR1 | 17 | 13 |
| 12 | Thuringia | Clueso | "Keinen Zentimeter" | No centimetre | Radio Top 40 | 146 | 2 |
| 13 | Bavaria | Sportfreunde Stiller | "Antinazibund" | Anti-Nazi alliance | Energy | 32 | 10 |
| 14 | Berlin | Culcha Candela | "Chica" | — | Energy Berlin | 66 | 7 |
| 15 | Baden-Württemberg | Laith Al-Deen | "Du" | You | Radio Regenbogen | 46 | 9 |
| 16 | Lower Saxony | Madsen | "Nachtbaden" | Night bathing | radio ffn | 94 | 4 |

== Scoreboard ==
| | Voting results | | | | | | | | | | | | | | | | |
|---|---|---|---|---|---|---|---|---|---|---|---|---|---|---|---|---|---|
| Hamburg | 19 | 12 | 1 | | | | | 6 | | | | | | | | | |
| Mecklenburg-Vorpommern | 79 | 7 | 12 | 3 | 3 | 5 | 6 | 4 | 7 | 7 | 2 | | 7 | 2 | 6 | 7 | 1 |
| Hesse | 51 | | 3 | 12 | 7 | 1 | 8 | 1 | 2 | 2 | | 4 | 1 | 1 | 2 | 1 | 6 |
| Saarland | 12 | | | | 12 | | | | | | | | | | | | |
| Saxony | 12 | | | | | 12 | | | | | | | | | | | |
| Saxony-Anhalt | 96 | 4 | 7 | 6 | 5 | 7 | | 5 | 6 | 12 | 5 | 7 | 8 | 6 | 5 | 6 | 7 |
| Bremen | 20 | 3 | | | | | 12 | | 1 | | | | | | | | 4 |
| Schleswig-Holstein | 75 | 5 | 4 | 2 | 4 | 3 | 3 | 12 | 4 | 5 | 6 | 2 | 5 | 4 | 7 | 4 | 5 |
| Brandenburg | 147 | 6 | 8 | 10 | 8 | 10 | 5 | 10 | 12 | 8 | 12 | 10 | 10 | 10 | 10 | 8 | 10 |
| North Rhine-Westphalia | 16 | 1 | | 1 | | | | | | | 10 | 1 | | | 1 | 2 | |
| Rhineland-Palatinate | 17 | | | | | | 2 | | | | 3 | 12 | | | | | |
| Thuringia | 146 | 10 | 10 | 8 | 10 | 8 | 10 | 8 | 10 | 10 | 8 | 8 | 12 | 8 | 8 | 10 | 8 |
| Bavaria | 32 | | 2 | | 2 | 6 | | | 3 | 3 | | | 4 | 12 | | | |
| Berlin | 66 | 2 | 5 | 4 | | 2 | 4 | 3 | 8 | 4 | 4 | 5 | 3 | 5 | 3 | 12 | 2 |
| Baden-Württemberg | 46 | | | 7 | 1 | | 1 | 2 | | 1 | 1 | 6 | 2 | 7 | 12 | 3 | 3 |
| Lower Saxony | 94 | 8 | 6 | 5 | 6 | 4 | 7 | 7 | 5 | 6 | 7 | 3 | 6 | 3 | 4 | 5 | 12 |
