= Gespaltene Persönlichkeit =

Studio album by Xavas
- Released: 2012
- Recorded: 2011–2012

Singles from Gespaltene Persöhnlichkeit
- 1. "Schau nicht mehr zurück" Released: 2012

Gespaltene Persönlichkeit ("Split Personality") is a 2012 studio album by Xavas, a musical project and collaboration between German soul and R&B singer Xavier Naidoo and German rapper Kool Savas. The name Xavas was chosen by taking the first letter of Xavier Naidoo's name and the last part of Kool Savas' name.

The album topped both the German and Swiss albums charts and peaked at number three in the Austrian albums chart.

== Background ==
=== Earlier collaborations ===
Xavier Naidoo and Kool Savas had cooperated on a great number of earlier occasions prior to the Xavas joint project. From 2002 to 2009, Savas had been producer of Besitzer a.k.a. Melanie Wilhelm on Optik Records. For the 17-track album for that project, Kool Savas included two tracks featuring Naidoo. In March 2005, Savas released a joint album called One with rapper Azad on Sony BMG, Optik Records and Azad's label Bozz Music. On a limited edition, Naidoo was also represented with a track "Was hab ich dir getan" produced by Milan Martelli. In 2010-2011, Savas and Naidoo engaged on a joint tour entitled Wir beaten mehr including appearances on 6 January 2011 in Hamburg and 7 January in Berlin to showcase various artists from R&B, soul, pop and hip-hop traditions. The line-up included Jan Delay, die Söhne Mannheims, Cassandra Steen, Adel Tawil, Max Herre, Joy Denalane, Azad, Sido, J-Luv, Marteria and Das Bo in addition to Savas and Naidoo performing together on stage. Naidoo appeared yet again on Savas' third album Aura as a guest artist. Naidoo also worked as backing vocals for the main track single from the album. The album reached number one in the German Album Charts.

=== Charting tracks ===
A possible joint album between the two was announced as early as October 2009 when Savas joined by telephone anonymously during a show by Naidoo on VIVA. Naidoo could not recognize Savas' voice and was genuinely surprised. Further speculation was raised during their joint concerts in January 2011 and album was confirmed in May 2011 with recording starting the following month.

The album Gespaltene Persönlichkeit ("Split personality") was released on 21 September 2012. "Schau nicht mehr zurück" ("Don't look back") was the main single release from the album.

The couple had taken part with the song "Schau nicht mehr zurück" in Bundesvision Song Contest, an annual pan-German competition created by German TV entertainer Stefan Raab, in which each of the 16 states of Germany nominates a song chosen by the regional radio stations of each of the states. The song, representing Baden-Württemberg received the highest points with 172 and emerged as 2012 winner as the best song.

In 2014 it was awarded a diamond certification from the Independent Music Companies Association, which indicated sales of at least 200,000 copies throughout Europe.

== Charting singles from the album ==
Year	Title	Chart Positions		
Year	Title	GER	AUT	SWI
2012	"Schau nicht mehr zurück"	2	14	3
2012	"Lass nicht los"	–	45	–
2012	"Die Zukunft trägt meinen Namen"	–	47	–
2012	"Wenn es Nacht ist"	–	52	–
2012	"Wage es zu glauben"	34	45	37

== Track listing ==
1. "Du wirst sehen" / "Gespaltene Persönlichkeit" (2:44)
2. "Schau nicht mehr zurück" (4:24)
3. "Gegen die Freundschaft" (3:15)
4. "Wenn es Nacht ist" (3:32)
5. "Du bereicherst mich" (3:27)
6. "Lass nicht los" (3:44)
7. "Ich bin ich" (skit) (1:28)
8. "Form von Liebe" (3:19)
9. "Die Zukunft trägt meinen Namen" (3:42)
10. "Wage es zu Glauben" (3:36)
11. "X.A.V.A.S." (3:43)
12. "Mehr als sie" (feat. Olli Banjo) (4:29)
13. "Abschiedsfluss" (3:51)
14. "Satan weiche" (3:16)
15. "Lied vom Leben" (7:14)
16. "Wo sind sie jetzt" (hidden track)

== Charts ==
=== Weekly charts ===
Chart (2012–13)	Peak position
Austrian Albums (Ö3 Austria)	3
German Albums (Offizielle Top 100)	1
Swiss Albums (Schweizer Hitparade)	1

=== Year-end charts ===
Chart (2012)	Position
Austrian Albums (Ö3 Austria)	36
German Albums (Offizielle Top 100)	17
Swiss Albums (Schweizer Hitparade)	21
