= Kool Savas =

German rapper

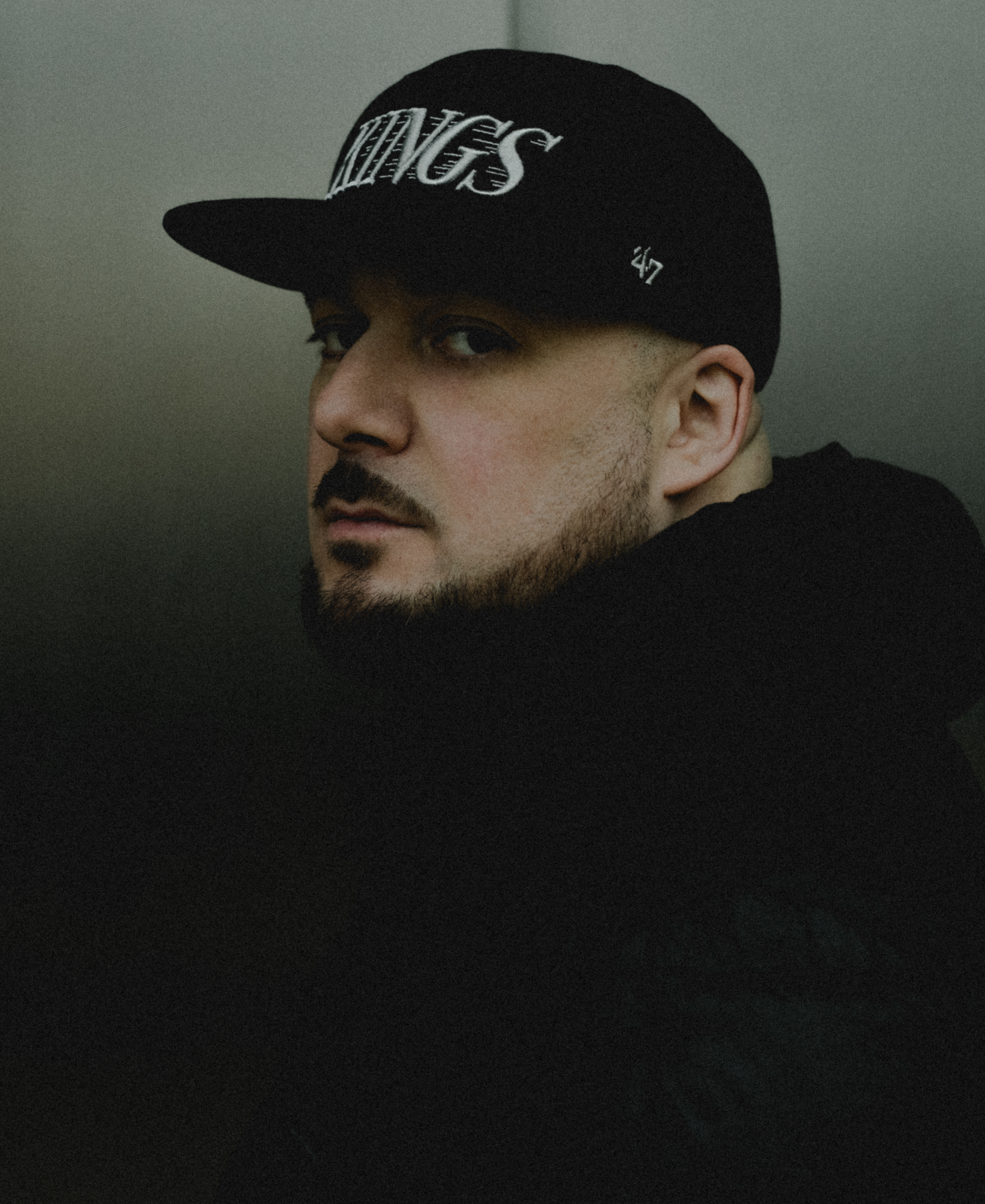
- Kool Savas in 2019

Background information
- Also known as: King Kool Savas, S.A.V., Essah
- Born: Savaş Yurderi; 10 February 1975 (age 51); Aachen, West Germany
- Genres: German hip hop, battle rap
- Years active: 1995–present
- Labels: Essah (since 2009); Sony (since 2002); Optik (2002–2009); Subword (2002–2007); Put Da Needle to Da (1999–2001)
- Spouse: Maria Yurderi
- Website: koolsavas.de

Savaş Yurderi (born 10 February 1975), known by his stage name Kool Savas, is a German rapper. Along with Taktlo$$, he formed the highly influential German rap duo Westberlin Maskulin (1997–2000). He was also a founding member of the German rap crew Masters of Rap in 1996. Savas is considered one of the most successful German rappers.

In 2012, he collaborated in "Xavas", a duo formation with Xavier Naidoo, a German soul and R&B singer-songwriter and actor in the album Gespaltene Persönlichkeit. The two had already worked together on a number of other releases.

== Early life ==
Yurderi was born on 10 February 1975 in Aachen, Germany, the son of a German mother and a Turkish father from Çorum. Savaş returned to Turkey with his family when he was one year old. His father was sentenced to five years in prison in Turkey due to political problems.

He later returned to Germany with his mother. His father also returned with them. They were then settled in Berlin. He currently lives in Berlin with his wife Maria Yurderi and their child.

== Career ==
=== Essah Entertainment (2010–present) ===
His 2011 album Aura included a single with the same name and a song featuring Xavier Naidoo, titled LMS 2012. In May 2012, Savas announced a collaborative album with Xavier Naidoo titled Gespaltene Persönlichkeit under the alias "Xavas" scheduled for release in Germany on 21 September 2012. The track list was announced in August 2012, containing a total of 15 tracks

His fourth studio album, Märtyrer, was released on 14 November 2014.

== Discography ==
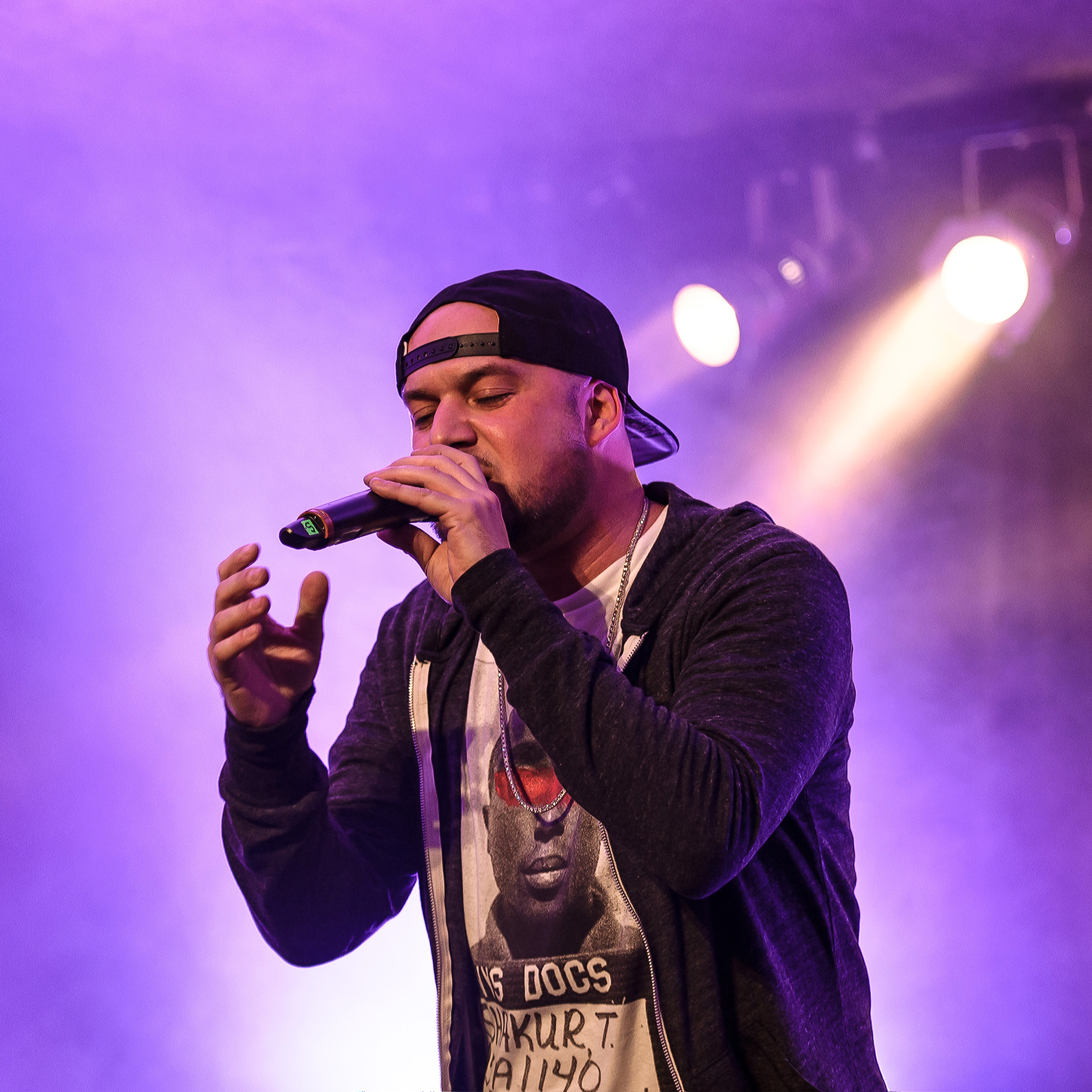
Savas performing

Studio albums

- 2002: Der beste Tag meines Lebens
- 2007: Tot oder lebendig
- 2011: Aura
- 2014: Märtyrer
- 2019: KKS
- 2021: Aghori

Mixtapes

- 2004: Kool Savas goes Hollywood
- 2005: Die John Bello Story
- 2006: Wer hatz erfunden? (with Optik Schweiz)
- 2008: Die John Bello Story II
- 2009: Die John Bello Story II – Brainwash Edition (remix version)
- 2010: Die John Bello Story III
- 2016: Essahdamus

Remix albums

- 2004: Die besten Tage sind gezählt

Compilations

- 2008: The Best of Kool Savas

Collaboration albums

- 1997: Hoes, Flows, Moneytoes (with Westberlin Maskulin)
- 2000: Battlekings (with Westberlin Maskulin)
- 2001: NLP (with M.O.R.)
- 2003: Nur noch 24 Stunden (with Freunde der Sonne)
- 2005: One (with Azad)
- 2006: Optik Takeover! (with Optik Army)
- 2012: Gespaltene Persönlichkeit (with Xavier Naidoo as Xavas)
- 2017: Royal Bunker (with Sido)
