= Bosse (musician) =

German musician (born 1980)

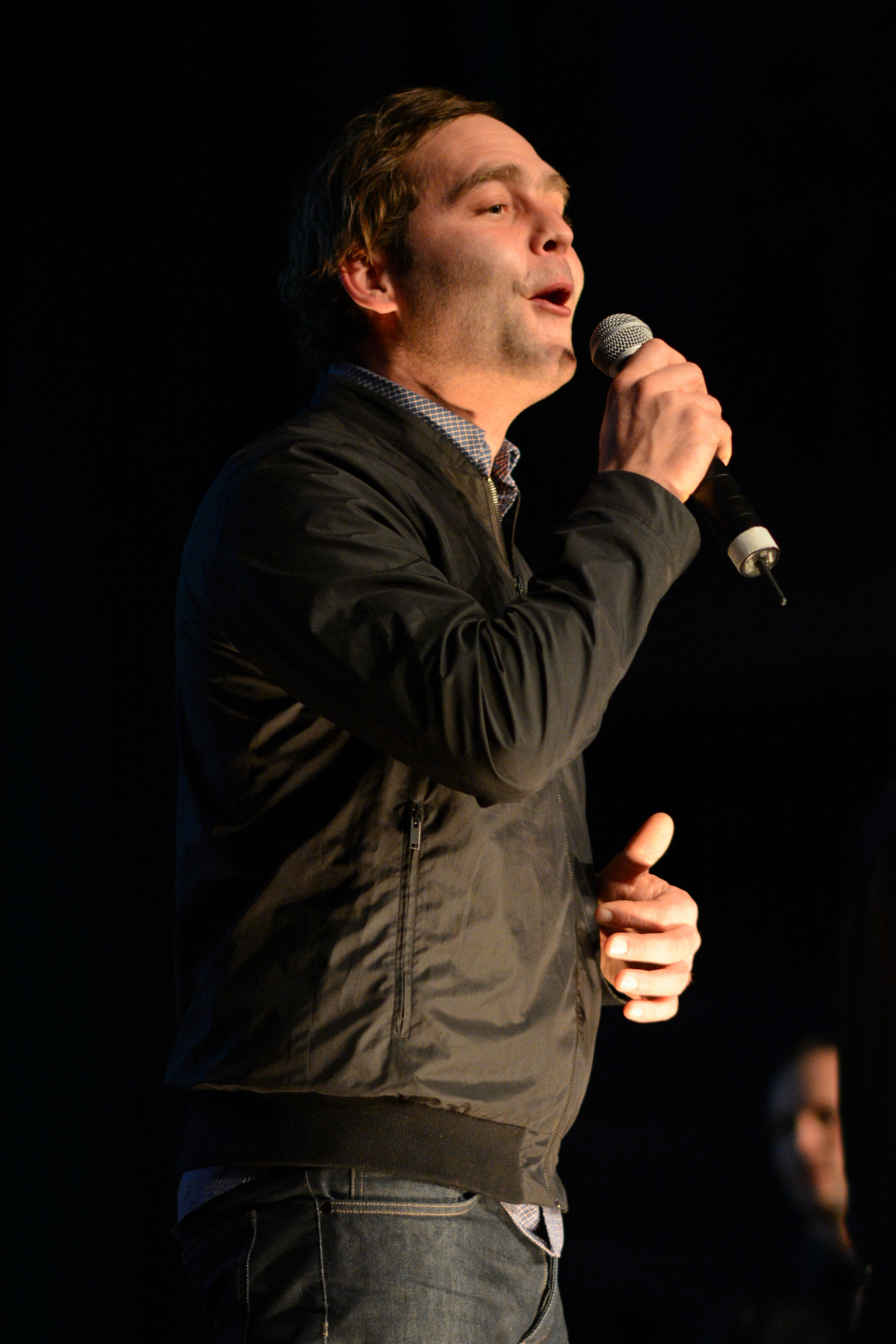
- Bosse performing in 2014

Background information
- Born: Axel Bosse; 22 February 1980 (age 46); Braunschweig, Germany
- Genres: Pop rock
- Occupation: Musician
- Instruments: Vocals; guitar
- Website: axelbosse.de

Bosse (born Axel Bosse; 22 February 1980) is a German rock singer and guitarist. Bosse is also the name of his backup band.

== Biography ==
Bosse was born in Braunschweig. In 2005, he released his first single, "Kraft". Soon after, his band performed in a farewell tour for Such a Surge. After the tour ended in April 2005, they released their first album, Kamikazeherz. This album achieved considerable success at that time, with the revival of German rock.

On 28 July 2006, the band released their second album, Guten Morgen Spinner, with the accompanying single "Die Irritierten".

6 February 2009 saw the release of their third album, Taxi. Before the album, the band left their label, EMI. In collaboration with Jochen Naaf, Bosse produced the record themselves. The single "3 Millionen" was released in early 2009, and received much airplay. Axel Bosse was also a featured artist on Deutsche Welle's PopXport.

On 29 September 2011, Bosse came in third place in the annual Bundesvision Song Contest, out of 16 contestants, one from each German state. Bosse represented Lower Saxony and sang "Frankfurt Oder", from their fourth album, Wartesaal (2011).

Bosse was nominated as Best Artist at the 1LIVE Krone 2011 awards. They came in second place, losing out to Clueso.

On 8 March 2013, the band released their fifth album, Kraniche, and confirmed a tour through Germany.

Bosse made their second appearance on the annual Bundesvision Song Contest on 27 September 2013, this time coming in first place. They once again represented Lower Saxony, and sang "So Oder So", a single from Kraniche.

Bosse was nominated as Best Artist again at the 1LIVE Krone 2013 awards. They came in second place, losing out to Casper.

In 2017, Dutch rock band BLØF scored one of the biggest hits in Dutch history with "Zoutelande", their adaptation of Bosse's "Frankfurt Oder".

== Band members ==
- Axel Bosse – vocals
- Björn Krüger – drums
- Thorsten Sala – guitar
- Theofilos Fotiades – bass

== Discography ==
Studio albums

Year	Title	Chart positions			Certifications
Year	Title	GER	AUT	SWI	Certifications
2005	Kamikazeherz (de)	—	—	—	
2006	Guten Morgen Spinner (de)	—	—	—	
2009	Taxi (de)	96	—	—	
2011	Wartesaal (de)	9	—	—	
2013	Kraniche (de)	4	—	—	BVMI: Gold
2016	Engtanz (de)	1	28	92	
2018	Alles ist jetzt	1	—	—	
2021	Sunnyside	3	—	—	

EPs

- 2008: Kurzstrecke

Live albums

- 2014: Kraniche – Live in Hamburg
- 2016: Leise Landung – Die Kraniche Akustiktournee 2014

Compilations

- 2011: Classic Albums: Kamikazeherz / Guten Morgen Spinner

Singles

- 2005: "Kraft"
- 2005: "Keine Panik"
- 2005: "Niemand vermisst uns"
- 2006: "Die Irritierten"
- 2009: "3 Millionen"
- 2009: "Liebe ist leise"
- 2009: "Sommer lang" (feat. Frida)
- 2011: "Weit weg"
- 2011: "Wartesaal"
- 2011: "Frankfurt Oder" (feat. Anna Loos)
- 2013: "Schönste Zeit"
- 2013: "So oder so"
- 2013: "Kraniche"
- 2013: "Vier Leben"
- 2015: "Steine"
- 2016: "Immer so lieben"
- 2016: "Dein Hurra"
- 2016: "Außerhalb der Zeit"
- 2018: "Alles ist jetzt"
- 2018: "Augen zu Musik an"
- 2019: "Ich warte auf dich"
- 2019: "Hallo Hometown"
- 2019: "Messer" (with Prinz Pi feat. Capital Bra)
- 2020: "Der letzte Tanz"
- 2020: "Warum geht es mir so dreckig"
- 2020: "Das Paradies"
- 2021: "Wild nach deinen Augen"
- 2021: "Sunnyside"
- 2021: "Der Sommer"
