= Delta radio =

Coordinates: 54°19′30″N 10°05′02″E

delta radio
- Kiel, Germany; Germany
- Broadcast area: Schleswig-Holstein, Hamburg
- Frequency: Various
- Branding: delta radio

Programming
- Format: Alternative rock

Ownership
- Owner: Mach3

History
- First air date: 1 July 1993

Links
- Webcast: Livestream
- Website: www.deltaradio.de

delta radio is a radio station from Kiel, Germany. It is a branch of Mach3 Broadcasting along with Radio Schleswig-Holstein (RS-H) and Radio Nora (all of Kiel). The French Lagardère Group holds shares in the company. Delta radio prides itself for its different, and alternative image, as its slogan "Klingt anders" (lit.: sounds different) sums up. Delta radio has been a focal point for numerous northern German, and even Scandinavian bands to get their footing in the Central European market (e.g. One Fine Day, H-Blockx, and Dúné). Delta radio focuses on rock music and is a sponsor station of Indiecator.com a site for new and upcoming bands in the region.

Aside from the music that the station plays, the station also continues to make its listeners a top priority, e.g. the delta radio morning show was at times titled "Mit Danny, Sarah, und euch" [With Danny, Sarah, and you]. Delta Radio however is expanding its listenership through playing some traditional pop music (known as charts) as it is one of few privately owned and operated radio station in Germany without government subsidies or ownership like the public broadcasters of NDR or SWR.

The radio DJs will be replaced occasionally because several of them are students of Kiel University and other schools of higher education. Except for Sarah, Chris and Ralle they serve as part-time employees. DJ Ralle has been working for delta radio since the station was founded in 1993.

Delta radio is also a sponsor of the Kiel Baltic Hurricanes American Football team which is a regular competitor for the German American Football Championship.

Delta Radio can be received via terrestrial Digital Audio Broadcasting or via Webstream.

== DAB+ Frequency listing ==
Block	Station
10D Hamburg	Hamburg
11D Flensburg	Flensburg
5A Kiel	Kiel
6B Kiel	Neumünster
9D Lübeck	Lübeck
8C Heide	Heide

== FM Frequency listing before Delta Radio FM-switchoff on Nov. 23rd, 2025 ==
Frequency	Station
93.4	Hamburg and western suburbs
96.5	Hamburg and eastern suburbs
100.4	Heide, Itzehoe, Meldorf, Tönning, Brunsbüttel, Garding, St. Peter-Ording
103.5	Heligoland
104.1	Eutin, Fehmarn, Plön, Lütjenburg, Oldenburg, Neustadt, Bad Malente
104.8	Sylt
105.6	Flensburg, Niebüll, Husum, Schleswig, Achtrup, Glücksburg, Kappeln, Bredstedt
105.6	Lauenburg, Geesthacht, Schwarzenbek
105.9	Kiel, Neumünster, Rendsburg, Eckernförde, Nortorf, Preetz
107.4	Hamburg, Norderstedt, Bad Segeberg, Elmshorn, Glückstadt, Kaltenkirchen, Quickborn, Uetersen, Ahrensburg, Reinbek, Bargteheide, Pinneberg
107.7	Hamburg and eastern suburbs of Reinbek and Geesthacht
107.9	Lübeck, Bad Oldesloe, Bad Schwartau, Bad Segeberg, Timmendorfer Strand, Travemünde, Ratzeburg, Reinfeld, Hamburg, Mölln
