= Bundesvision Song Contest 2005 =

German music competition

Date and venue
- Final: 12 February 2005
- Venue: König Pilsener Arena, Oberhausen, North Rhine-Westphalia

Organisation
- Presenters: Stefan Raab; Annette Frier; Oliver Pocher (green room)
- Participation map: Legend; 1st place 2nd place 3rd place 4th place 5th place 6th place 7th place 8th place 9th place 10th place 11th place 12th place 13th place 14th place 15th place 16th place

Vote
- Voting system: Each state awards 12, 10, 8–1 points to their top 10 songs.
- Winning song: Hesse "Geile Zeit" by Juli

The Bundesvision Song Contest 2005 was the first edition of the annual Bundesvision Song Contest musical event. The contest was held on 12 February 2005 at the König Pilsener Arena in Oberhausen, North Rhine-Westphalia. The contest was hosted by Stefan Raab, Annette Frier, and Oliver Pocher in the green room. It was the first Germany-wide music competition in this format.

== Origins ==
The concept of the Bundesvision Song Contest was first introduced during episode 657 of the late-night television comedy talk show TV total by presenter Stefan Raab on 20 December 2004. The structure of the Bundesvision Song Contest is very similar to that of the Eurovision Song Contest, held among European countries; the Bundesvision Song Contest uses the sixteen states of Germany, only songs with (at least partially) German-speaking text were allowed, Stefan Raab also announced that the winning state would host the Bundesvision Song Contest 2006.

From 17 January 2005, the participants and their states were presented on TV total, for four weeks a themed evening was organised for each artist, in addition to a discussion with Raab about the chosen song.

Because suitable representatives were not found for all states, some artists represented states, to which they had no or only a very indirect tie, earning some criticism of the contest, for example, Cologne based band Klee representing Saarland, and not North Rhine-Westphalia.

== Contest overview ==
The winner of the Bundesvision Song Contest 2005 was alternative pop band Juli with the song "Geile Zeit", representing Hessen. In second place were Fettes Brot representing Schleswig-Holstein, and third place to Sido with Brainless Wankers representing Berlin.

14 of the 16 states awarded themselves the maximum of 12 points, with North Rhine-Westphalia, and Rhineland-Palatinate, awarding themselves 10 points each.

The contest was broadcast by ProSieben and watched by 3.23 million people (11% market share). In the 14-49 age range 2.55 million people watched the contest (21.2% market share).

== Results ==
Bundesvision Song Contest 2005
R/O	State	Artist	Song	English translation	Radio station	Points	Place
1	North Rhine-Westphalia	Mamadee feat. Gentleman	"Lass los"	Let go	Radio NRW	10	15
2	Hamburg	Samy Deluxe	"Generation"	—	Tide 96.0	44	9
3	Rhineland-Palatinate	Sandy feat. Manuellsen	"Unexpected"	—	bigFM	10	15
4	Bremen	Lukas Hilbert feat. Trina	"Kommt meine Liebe nicht bei dir an"	Does my love not reach to you	Energy Bremen	31	11
5	Bavaria	Slut	"Why Pourquoi (I Think I Like You)"	—	Rock Antenne	17	12
6	Brandenburg	Virginia Jetzt!	"Wahre Liebe"	True love	94,3 rs2	54	8
7	Schleswig-Holstein	Fettes Brot	"Emanuela"	—	delta radio	130	2
8	Saarland	Klee	"Gold"	—	Radio Salü	37	10
9	Saxony	De Randfichten	"Jetzt geht die Party richtig los"	Now the party really starts	Radio PSR	71	6
10	Baden-Württemberg	Apocalyptica feat. Marta Jandová	"Wie weit"	How far	bigFM	77	5
11	Saxony-Anhalt	Jansen & Kowalski	"Mamacita"	—	Radio Brocken	15	13
12	Hesse	Juli	"Geile Zeit"	Great time	Hit Radio FFH	159	1
13	Thuringia	Clueso	"Kein Bock zu gehen"	No desire to go	Radio Top 40	63	7
14	Berlin	Sido with Brainless Wankers	"Mama ist stolz"	Mum is proud	Kiss FM	113	3
15	Mecklenburg-Vorpommern	Deichkind	"Electric Super Dance Band"	—	Antenne MV	12	14
16	Lower Saxony	Mousse T. with Emma Lanford	"Right About Now"	—	radio ffn	85	4

== Scoreboard ==
	Voting results																
North Rhine-Westphalia	10	10															
Hamburg	44	1	12	2	5	2		8	4		4		1		1	2	2
Rhineland-Palatinate	10			10													
Bremen	31	2		1	12		3		1	1	1			3		1	6
Bavaria	17		1		1	12									3		
Brandenburg	54					1	12	3		6	2	5	2	4	8	6	5
Schleswig-Holstein	130	8	10	8	8	8	6	12	8	8	8	6	10	7	7	8	8
Saarland	37		2		3		1	4	12	2		2	3	2	5		1
Saxony	71	5		4		4	7	1	3	12	3	8	6	8	2	5	3
Baden-Württemberg	77	4	6	5	4	5	4	5	5	5	12	3	5	6		4	4
Saxony-Anhalt	15		3									12					
Hesse	159	12	8	12	7	10	8	10	10	10	10	10	12	10	10	10	10
Thuringia	63	3	5	3	2	3	5	2	2	4	5	4	4	12	6	3	
Berlin	113	7	4	6	6	7	10	6	7	7	7	7	8	5	12	7	7
Mecklenburg-Vorpommern	12															12	
Lower Saxony	85	6	7	7	10	6	2	7	6	3	6	1	7	1	4		12

== Spokespersons ==
- North Rhine-Westphalia – Tobias Häusler
- Hamburg – Matthias Lorenz-Meyer & Beata Arnold
- Rhineland-Palatinate – Carmen Christin Burger
- Bremen – Bella Lesnik
- Bavaria – Holger Barnsteiner
- Brandenburg – Marcus Kaiser
- Schleswig-Holstein – Kaya Laß
- Saarland – Martina Straten
- Saxony – Peter Imhof
- Baden-Württemberg – Hans Blomberg
- Sachsen-Anhalt – Thomas Schminke
- Hesse – Johannes Scherer
- Thuringia – Anne Voigt
- Berlin – Boussa Thiam
- Mecklenburg-Vorpommern – Jens Herrmann
- Lower Saxony – Frank Schambor
