= Elton (television presenter) =

German television presenter and comedian

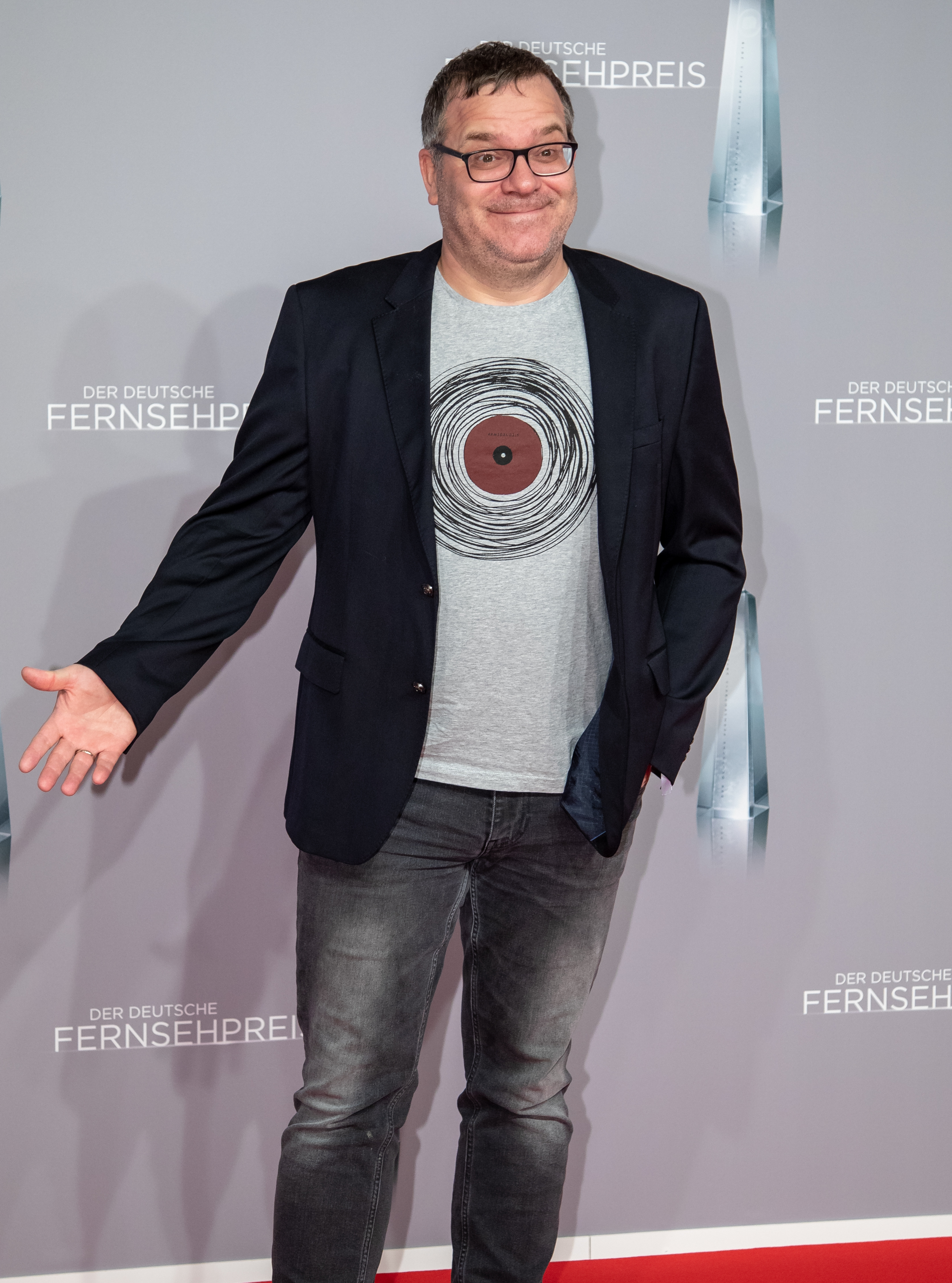
- Elton in 2019
- Born: Alexander Duszat; 2 April 1971 (age 55); West Berlin, West Germany
- Occupations: Television presenter; comedian
- Years active: 2001–present
- Spouse: Yvonne Duszat (after 2003)
- Children: 2
- Awards: See Awards
- Website: tv-elton.de

Alexander Duszat (born 2 April 1971), known professionally as Elton, is a German television presenter and comedian who gained recognition as Stefan Raab's sidekick in the long-running late-night comedy show TV total.

== Early life ==
Elton was born on 2 April 1971 in West Berlin, but grew up and went to school in Jork near Hamburg. He finished his traineeship as a television and radio technician.

== Career ==
Later, he hosted several shows for the local television channel Hamburg 1, where he first appeared under the nickname Elton, which was given to him due to a reportedly similar appearance to Elton John.

In February 2001, he was hired by the popular German entertainer Stefan Raab as an intern and sidekick for his late-night comedy show TV total on ProSieben. In December 2001, Elton started to host his own show, Elton.tv, which was produced by Raab's company Raab TV and canceled in March 2003. Along with Sonya Kraus, Elton also hosted the reality shows Die Alm in July 2004 and Die Burg in January 2005.

When Stefan Raab boxed Regina Halmich in early 2007, Elton promised to participate at the New York City Marathon in case Raab should stand more than five rounds. Since Raab lasted all six rounds, Elton started his training and eventually finished the Marathon in 5:30:01 hrs, placed 34202nd.

== Personal life ==
Since November 2003, Elton has been married to Yvonne Duszat with whom he has two kids.

== Work ==
=== Shows, regular participation ===
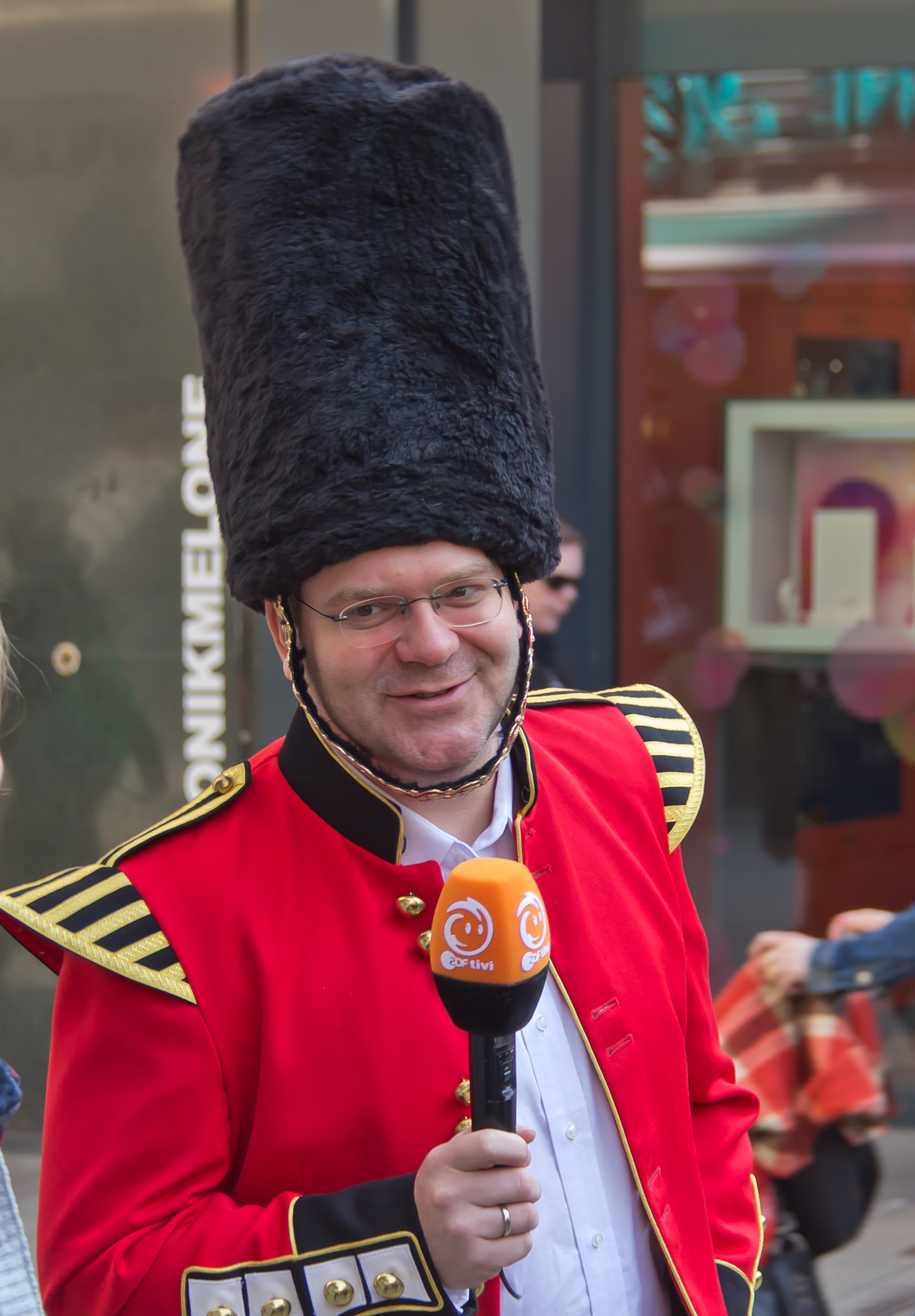
Elton in 2012

- 2001–2015: TV total (sidekick of Stefan Raab)
- 2001–2003; 2013: elton.tv (2013; on MySpass.de)
- 2004–2006: Elton vs. Simon (with Simon Gosejohann)
- 2008, 2010, 2012: Elton vs. Simon – Die Show (with Simon Gosejohann and Johanna Klum)
- 2009: Germany's Next Showstars (judge with DJ BoBo and Verona Pooth)
- 2011: Elton reist
- 2012: Elton vs. Simon – die Liveshow
- since 2015: Wer weiß denn sowas?
- 2017: Kaum zu glauben! (2 shows in a team)

=== Filmography ===
- 2004: Das Büro (TV series, 1st season, episode 7)
- 2005: Rent a Pocher (TV show, 4th season, episodes 1–2)
- 2006: Axel! will's wissen (TV series, 2nd season, episode 10)
- 2007: Die ProSieben Märchenstunde – Tischlein deck dich (TV Show)
- 2008: Instructor Schmidt

=== Presenting ===
- 2004: Die Alm (with Sonya Kraus)
- 2005: Die Burg (with Sonya Kraus)
- 2006–2015: Bundesvision Song Contest (in the Green Room)
- 2006–2015: Schlag den Raab (host of the game Blamieren oder Kassieren)
- 2007: The Dome (with Gülcan Kamps and Marta Jandová)
- since 2010: 1, 2 oder 3
- 2013: Elton zockt – LIVE
- 2013: Wetten, dass..? (host of a game)
- 2014: Millionärswahl
- since 2016: Schlag den Star (opponent of Lukas Podolski)
- since 2016: Die Superpauker
- 2016: Das ProSieben Auswärtsspiel
- since 2016: Elton!
- 2017–2018: Schlag den Henssler
- 2018: Unser Lied für Lissabon
- since 2018: Alle gegen Einen
- since 2019: Schlag den Besten

=== Voice acting ===
- 2005: Der kleine Eisbär 2 – Die geheimnisvolle Insel (German voice of Bill)
- 2007: Halo 3 (video game; as Chips Dubbo)
- 2008: Beverly Hills Chihuahua (German voice of Chico)
- 2009: Donkey Schott (as Esel Rucio)
- 2011: Puss in Boots (German voice of Humpty Dumpty)
- 2012: Janosch: Komm, wir finden einen Schatz (as Kurt)

=== Guest appearances ===
- 2006–2007: Genial daneben (3 appearances)
- 2007, 2011: Lafer! Lichter! Lecker! (2 appearances)
- 2009: Zimmer frei! (1 appearance)
- 2010: Wir sind Kaiser (1 appearance)
- 2011: Die perfekte Minute (1 appearance)
- 2011: Tietjen und Hirschhausen (1 appearance)
- 2011: Das große Allgemeinwissensquiz (2 appearances with Hellmuth Karasek as a Joker)
- 2013: Deutschlands Superhirn (1 appearance)
- 2013, 2018: Markus Lanz (2 appearances)
- 2014–2015: Quizduell (2 appearances)
- 2016, 2018: NDR Talk Show (2 appearances)
- 2017: Wer wird Millionär? (1 appearance)

=== Books ===
- 2010: Mühsam ernährt sich das Eichhörnchen. Zum Glück bin ich keins!

== Awards ==
- 2003: Romy-Award: "Beliebtester Newcomer" ("favorite newcomer")
- 2007: Nickelodeon Kids' Choice Awards: "Hidden Talent"
- 2008: Deutscher Comedypreis: "Best Comedy-Show" for Elton vs. Simon (with Johanna Klum and Simon Gosejohann)
- 2012: Deutscher Comedypreis: "Bester Comedyevent" for Elton vs. Simon – Die Live-Show (with Johanna Klum and Simon Gosejohann)
