= Ich hab dich =

Single by Nadja Benaissa

from the album Schritt für Schritt
- Released: 12 September 2005
- Length: 5:10
- Label: Universal
- Songwriter(s): Nadja Benaissa; Tino Oac
- Producer(s): Tino Oac

Nadja Benaissa singles chronology
"Es ist Liebe" (2005)	"Ich hab dich" (2005)

"Ich hab dich" (English: I Got You) is a song by German recording artist Nadja Benaissa. It was written by Benaissa and Tino Oac for her debut solo album Schritt für Schritt (2006), while production was helmed by Oac. A slightly remixed version of the song, produced by Paul NZA, was released as the album's second single and reached the top forty of the German Singles Chart, becoming the album's highest-charting single. "Ich hab dich" served as the Hessian entry at the Bundesvision Song Contest 2006, where it eventually placed fourth.

== Track listings ==
CD single
No.	Title	Length
1.	"Ich hab dich" (single version)	4:13
2.	"Ich hab dich" (album version)	5:10
3.	"Ich hab dich" (album version instrumental)	5:10

Enhanced maxi single
No.	Title	Length
1.	"Ich hab dich" (single version)	4:13
2.	"Know Your Emotion"	4:15
3.	"Ich hab dich" (album version)	5:10
4.	"Ich hab dich" (album version instrumental)	5:10
5.	"Ich hab dich" (Video)	4:13

== Credits and personnel ==
- Nadja Benaissa – lead vocals, lyrics, music
- Ulf Hattwig – mastering
- Alex Nies – drums, percussion
- Tini Oac – mixing, production, recording
- Woolf Schönecker – guitar
- Florian Sitzmann – mixing, organ

== Charts ==
Chart (2006)	Peak position
Austria (Ö3 Austria Top 40)	60
Germany (GfK)	36
