= Bundesvision Song Contest 2006 =

German music competition

Date and venue
- Final: 9 February 2006
- Venue: Mittelhessen-Arena, Wetzlar, Hesse

Organisation
- Presenters: Stefan Raab; Janin Reinhardt; Elton (green room)
- Participation map: Legend; 1st place 2nd place 3rd place 4th place 5th place 6th place 7th place 8th place 9th place 10th place 11th place 12th place 13th place 14th place 15th place 16th place

Vote
- Voting system: Each state awards 12, 10, 8–1 points to their top 10 songs.
- Winning song: Berlin "Ding" by Seeed

The Bundesvision Song Contest 2006 was the second edition of the annual Bundesvision Song Contest musical event. The contest was held on 9 February 2006 at the Mittelhessen-Arena in Wetzlar, Hesse, following Juli's win in the 2005 contest in North Rhine-Westphalia with the song "Geile Zeit". The contest was hosted by Stefan Raab, Janin Reinhardt, and Elton in the green room.

== Contest overview ==
The winner of the Bundesvision Song Contest 2006 was the band Seeed with the song "Ding", representing Berlin. In second place was Revolverheld representing Bremen, and third place went to In Extremo representing Thuringia.

14 of the 16 states awarded themselves the maximum of 12 points, with Saxony, and North Rhine-Westphalia, awarding themselves 10, and 5 points each, respectively.

The contest was broadcast by ProSieben and watched by 2.48 million people (9.1% market share). In the 14-49 age range 2.14 million viewers watched the show (18.3% market share).

== Results ==
Bundesvision Song Contest 2006
R/O	State	Artist	Song	English translation	Points	Place
1	North Rhine-Westphalia	AK4711	"Kein schönerer Land"	No country more beautiful	6	16
2	Lower Saxony	Marlon	"Was immer du willst"	Whatever you want	59	6
3	Saarland	Reminder	"Augen zu (und rein)"	Close your eyes and into it	17	13
4	Baden-Württemberg	Massive Töne	"Mein Job"	My job	47	9
5	Saxony-Anhalt	Toni Kater	"Liebe ist"	Love is	12	14
6	Thuringia	In Extremo	"Liam"	—	134	3
7	Rhineland-Palatinate	200 Sachen	"Sekt zum Frühstück"	Sekt for breakfast	18	12
8	Saxony	Die Raketen	"Popsong"	Pop song	10	15
9	Brandenburg	Diane	"Hast du kurz Zeit?"	Got some time?	35	10
10	Bavaria	TipTop	"TipTop"	—	53	7
11	Schleswig-Holstein	TempEau	"Schöner Tag"	Beautiful day	26	11
12	Hamburg	OleSoul	"Hamburg & Cologne"	—	70	5
13	Mecklenburg-Vorpommern	Pyranja	"Nie wieder"	Never again	50	8
14	Bremen	Revolverheld	"Freunde bleiben"	Staying friends	136	2
15	Hesse	Nadja Benaissa	"Ich hab' dich"	I've got you	104	4
16	Berlin	Seeed	"Ding"	Thing	151	1

== Scoreboard ==
	Voting results																
North Rhine-Westphalia	6	5											1				
Lower Saxony	59	4	12	1	3	5	5	1	2	3	3	1	3	3	5	3	5
Saarland	17			12				5									
Baden-Württemberg	47	2	4	4	12		4	3		1	5	3	2		2	4	1
Saxony-Anhalt	12					12											
Thuringia	134	8	7	7	8	10	12	8	12	8	8	7	6	7	8	8	10
Rhineland-Palatinate	18				1			12								5	
Saxony	10								10								
Brandenburg	35		1			3	2		4	12	1			5		1	6
Bavaria	53	3	3	2	4	2	6	2	5	4	12	2		2	1	2	3
Schleswig-Holstein	26			3								12	7	1	3		
Hamburg	70	6	5	5	5	1	3	4	1	2	4	6	12	4	4	6	2
Mecklenburg-Vorpommern	50	1	2		2	4	1		3	5	2	4	4	12	6		4
Bremen	136	10	10	8	7	8	10	7	7	7	7	10	10	8	12	7	8
Hesse	104	7	6	6	6	6	7	6	6	6	6	5	5	6	7	12	7
Berlin	151	12	8	10	10	7	8	10	8	10	10	8	8	10	10	10	12
