= Mittelhessen-Arena =

Multipurpose arena in Wetzlar, Germany

Coordinates: 50°33′54″N 8°30′30″E

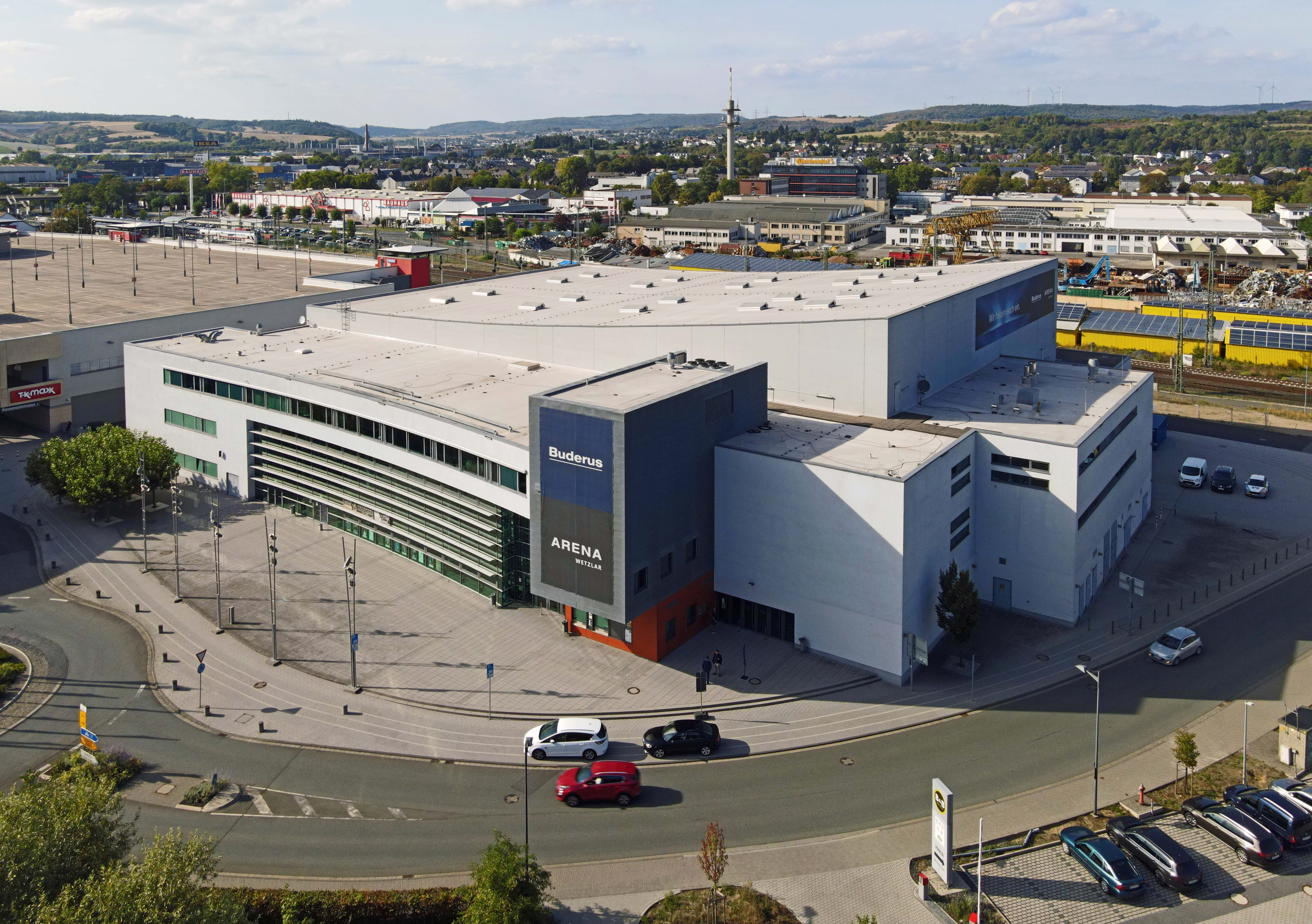
Buderus Arena Wetzlar (2022)

The Buderus Arena Wetzlar is a multipurpose indoor event facility located in Wetzlar, Germany. It hosts sports matches, concerts and exhibitions and is the home venue of the HSG Wetzlar handball team. The Arena is located beside Wetzlar railway station and the Forum Wetzlar shopping centre. The three establishments share a multistorey car park.

== History ==
It was opened as the Mittelhessen-Arena in March 2005, a few weeks after the opening of the neighbouring shopping centre. From 1 March 2006 the Arena was named the Rittal Arena Wetzlar, with nearby industrial firm Rittal obtaining the naming rights. Rittal's sponsorship ran until the end of 2021 and the venue became the Buderus Arena Wetzlar from 1 January 2022, when title sponsorship passed to Wetzlar-based Bosch Thermotechnik, owner of the Buderus brand.

== Facilities and events ==
The nominal capacity of the Arena for sporting events is around 4,500 seats, depending on the regulations of the sport involved and up to 6,000 for other purposes. It was one of the venues for the 2007 World Men's Handball Championship and hosted the Bundesvision Song Contest 2006.

== See also ==
- List of indoor arenas in Germany
