= Schritt für Schritt =

Studio album by Nadja Benaissa
- Released: 24 February 2006
- Length: 60:00
- Label: Universal Music Urban
- Producer: Audiotreats; Loomis Green; Tino Oac; Babar Omar; Giuseppe Porrello; DJ Release

Schritt für Schritt (English: Step by Step) is the debut solo album by German recording artist Nadja Benaissa. It was released by Universal Music Urban on February 24, 2006 in German-speaking Europe. Her first solo effort following the disbandment of her former band, No Angels, it signaled a breakaway from the group's Europop sound in favor of a more soul-influenced pop album with German lyrics. Benaissa co-wrote the whole album, which features production by Tino Oac and Giuseppe Porrello, with additional credits from DJ Release, Audiotreats and Fairtone. Upon its release, Schritt für Schritt underperformed, debuting and peaking at number 71 on the German Albums Chart.

== Critical reception ==
Professional ratings
Review scores
Source	Rating
CDStarts	5/10

CDStarts editor Matthias Reichel noted that "unfortunately, both – lyrics and melodies – don't have the quality to support an entire album. Because what works wonderfully [on "Es ist Liebe" and "Ich hab dich"] seems a bit monotonous when put into a running time of 60 minutes. With her deep timbre, Nadja Benaissa, as the German answer to Sade, tries to give the titles emotions and depth. But with its simple, biographically influenced lyrics and too few top songs, Schritt für Schritt cannot break free from the lower average range." Michael Agricola, writing for Marburg extra, described the album as "slow soul with thoughtful lyrics, velvety ballads in the style of the "Mannheim School," somewhere between Edo Zanki and Xavier Naidoo, but without pathos and without "mission." The core phrase is the single's gentle refrain: "It's love, only love, that takes me further." With that, all has been said. Simply cozy."

== Commercial performance ==
Released on 24 February 2006, Schritt für Schritt debuted and peaked at number 71 on the German Albums Chart and fell off the chart in its second week. A deluxe edition of the album, released to commemorate the 20th anniversary of Schritt für Schritt, was self-released by Benaissa on 13 February 2026. The edition features the single versions of "Es ist Liebe" and "Ich hab dich," along with the previously unreleased track "Familie," and new artwork.

== Track listing ==
Schritt für Schritt track listing
No.	Title	Writer(s)	Producer(s)	Length
1.	"Intro"	Giuseppe Porrello	Porrello	0:46
2.	"Schritt für Schritt"	Benaissa; Porrello	Porrello	3:31
3.	"Augenblick"	Benaissa; Frank Lotz; Karsten Chemnitz	Audiotreats	4:50
4.	"Leila" (Skit)	Benaissa; Tino Oac	Oac	0:33
5.	"Es ist Liebe"	Benaissa; Oac	Oac	3:57
6.	"Alles was du suchst"	Benaissa; Porrello	Porrello	4:12
7.	"Herzschlag"	Benaissa; DJ Release	DJ Release	4:33
8.	"Leila"	Benaissa; DJ Release	DJ Release	4:30
9.	"Weitergehen"	Benaissa; Oac	Oac	5:11
10.	"Ich hab dich"	Benaissa; Oac	Oac	5:10
11.	"Alte Wunden"	Benaissa; George Winston	Babar Omar; Loomis Green	4:22
12.	"Immer noch"	Benaissa; Porrello	Porrello	4:27
13.	"Die Welt"	Benaissa; Oac	Oac	5:05
14.	"Vater"	Benaissa; DJ Release	DJ Release	5:56
15.	"Alles führt zu dir" (Bonus track)	Benaissa; Porrello	Porrello; Green	3:15
Total length:				60:00

Deluxe edition
No.	Title	Writer(s)	Producer(s)	Length
16.	"Familie"	Benaissa; Omar; Green	Omar; Green	3:49
17.	"Es ist Liebe" (single version)	Benaissa; DJ Release	DJ Release	4:11
18.	"I hab' dich" (single version)	Benaissa; Oac	Oac; Paul NZA^{[a]}	4:10
Total length:				71:32

Notes

- ^{^[a]} denotes additional producer(s)

== Credits and personnel ==
Credits adapted from the liner notes of Schritt für Schritt.

Performers and musicians

- Susanne Bader – brass
- Loomis Green – bass guitar
- Jens Klingelhöfer – guitar
- Luniz – guitar
- Alex Nies – drums / percussion
- Andreas Neubauer – drums
- Annabell Owusu-Ansah – viola
- Giuseppe Porrello – guitar
- Christoph Riebling – piano
- Wolf Schönecker – guitar
- Florian Sitzmann – organ / cello

Technical

- Executive producers: Nadja Benaissa, Mengstu Zeleke
- Producer: Audiotreats, Fairtone, Tino Oac, Giuseppe Porrello, DJ Release
- Engineers: Nadja Benaissa, Loomis Green, Baba Omar
- Mixing: Ulf Hattwig, Wolfgang Manns, Toni Oac, Florian Sitzmann
- Mastering: Ulf Hattwig
- Art Direction: Oliver Daxenbichler
- Photography & Design: Oliver Daxenbichler

== Charts ==
Chart performance for Schritt für Schritt
Chart (2006)	Peak position
German Albums (Offizielle Top 100)	71

== Release history ==
Schritt für Schritt release history
Region	Date	Edition(s)	Format(s)	Label	Ref(s)
Various	24 February 2006	Standard	Digital download; CD	Universal Music Urban	
Various	13 February 2026	Deluxe	Digital download; LP	Self-released	
