= TipTop (band) =

TipTop is a German synthpop band from Bavaria. It consists of the two brothers Peter and Olli Brugger, who use the stage names Beau Frost and Olli Parton. Peter Brugger is well known as the singer and guitar player of the Munich-based band Sportfreunde Stiller.

Their stagenames are playing on a German frozen food company called "Bofrost" and United States country singer Dolly Parton respectively.

With a self-titled single (Tiptop) they participated in the 2006 Bundesvision Song Contest and came out seventh place out of 16 competitors. The single was released on the day before the contest (February 8, 2006) and reached the top 20 in Germany. It was also featured on EA Sports's 2006 FIFA World Cup video game.

== Discography ==
Albums

- Tiptop (2006)

Singles

- Tiptop (2006)
