= The Masked Singer (German TV series) season 10 =

The Masked Singer
- Season 10
- Starring: Palina Rojinski; Rick Kavanian; Various guests
- Hosted by: Matthias Opdenhövel
- No. of contestants: 8+1+6
- Winner: Mirja Boes as "Floh"
- Runner-up: Heiko & Roman Lochmann as "Flip Flops"
- No. of episodes: 6

Release
- Original network: ProSieben
- Original release: 6 April – 18 May 2024

Season chronology
- ← Previous; Season 9 Next → Season 11

The tenth season of the German singing competition The Masked Singer premiered on 6 April 2024 on ProSieben.

== Panelists and host ==
Season 10 main panelists and host

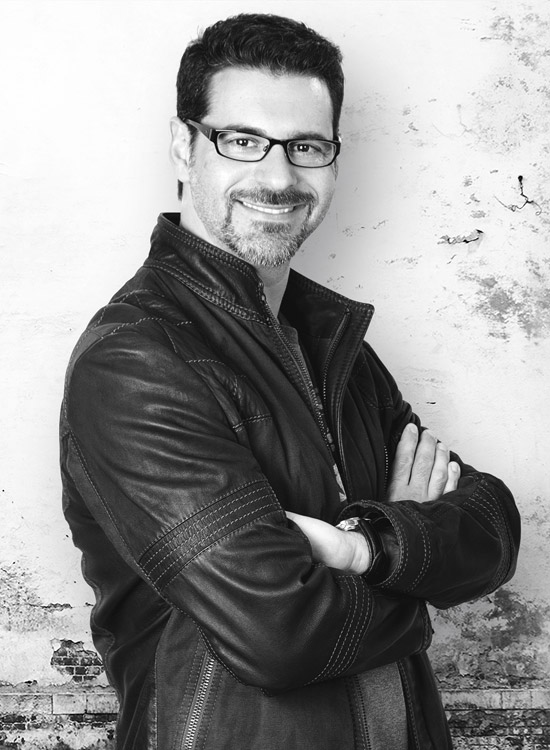
Rick Kavanian

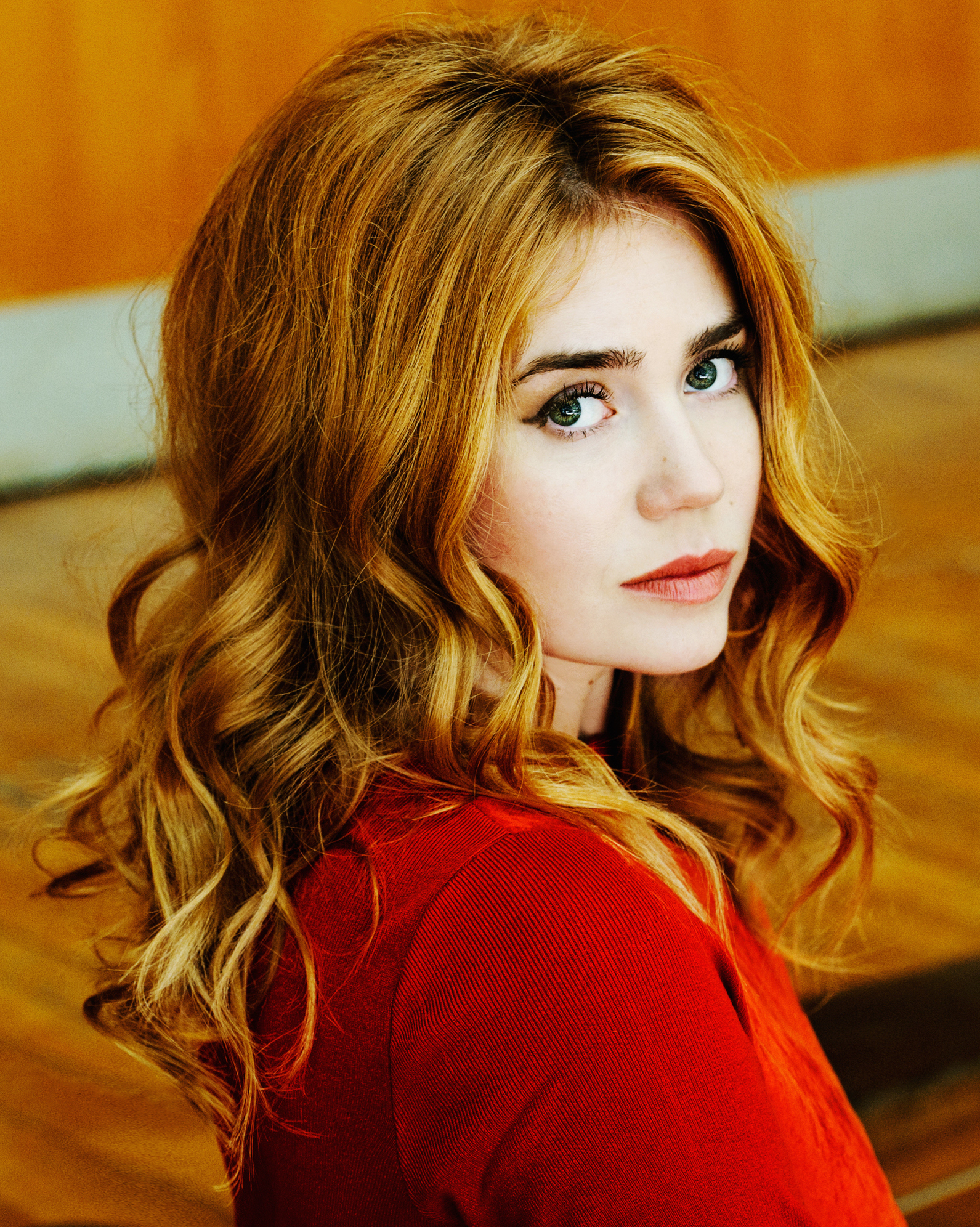
Palina Rojinski

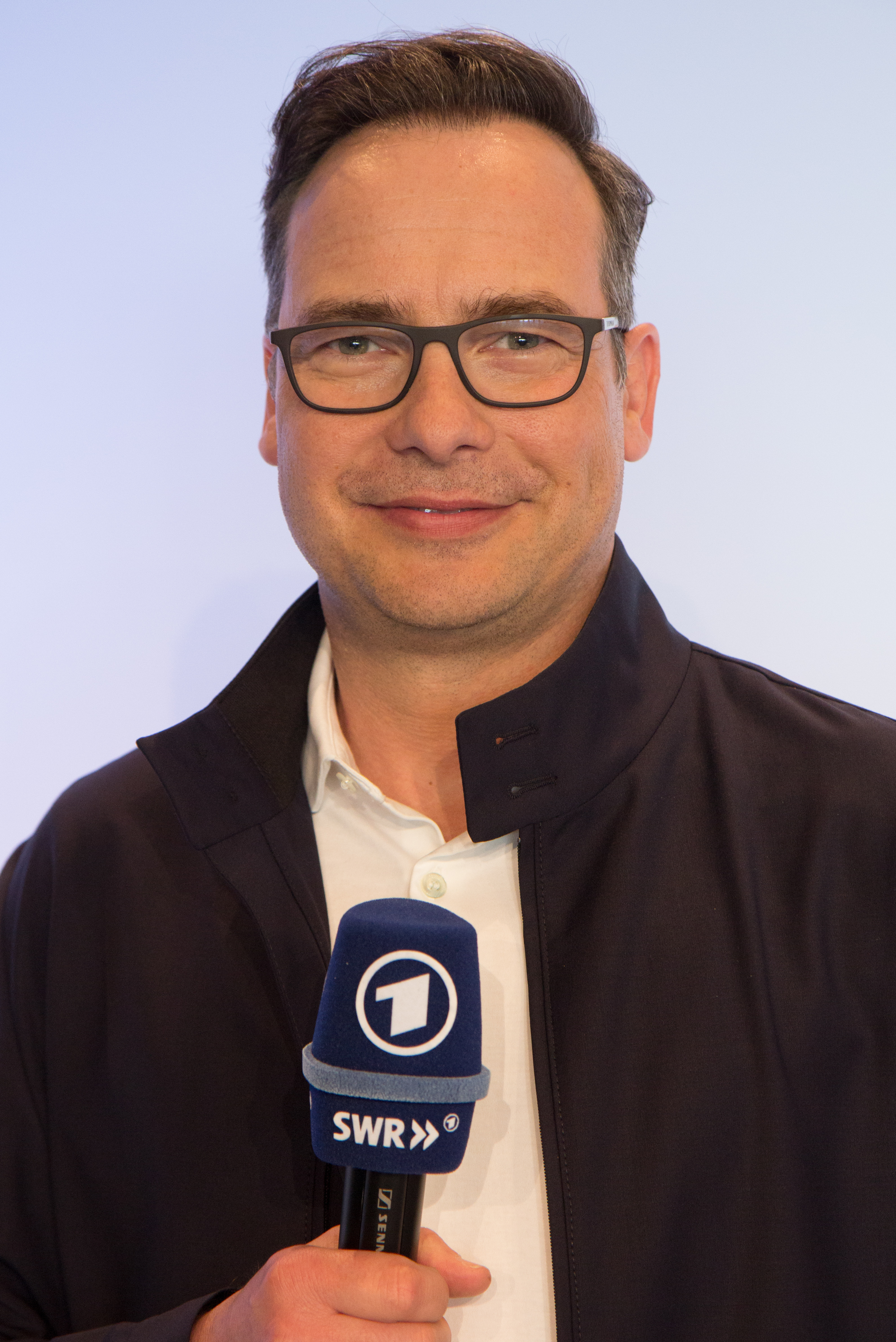
Matthias Opdenhövel

TV presenter Rick Kavanian returned for his second season, and Palina Rojinski is a new panelist. Matthias Opdenhövel returned for his tenth season as host.

=== Guest panelists ===
Season 10 guest panelists

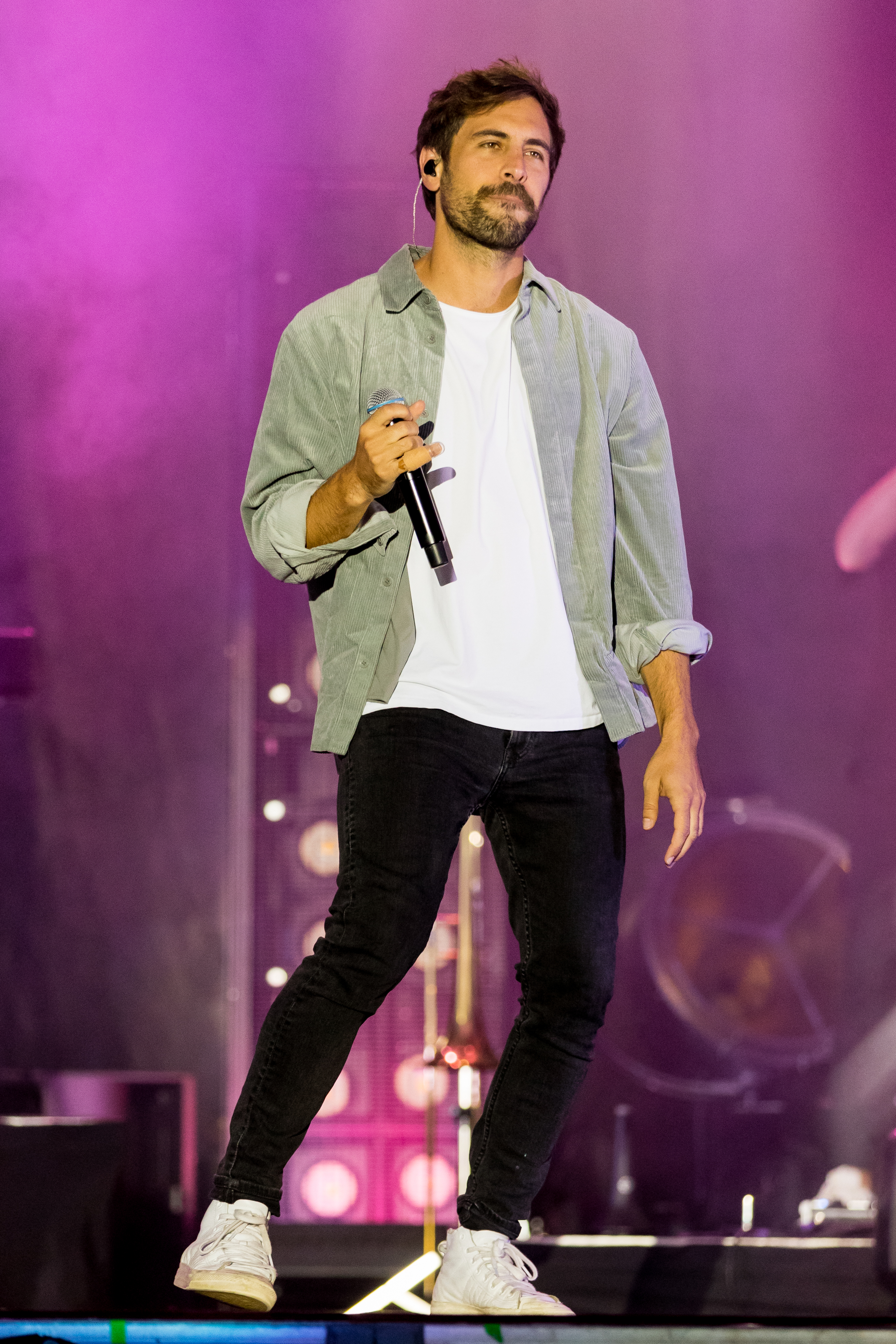
Max Giesinger (episode 1)

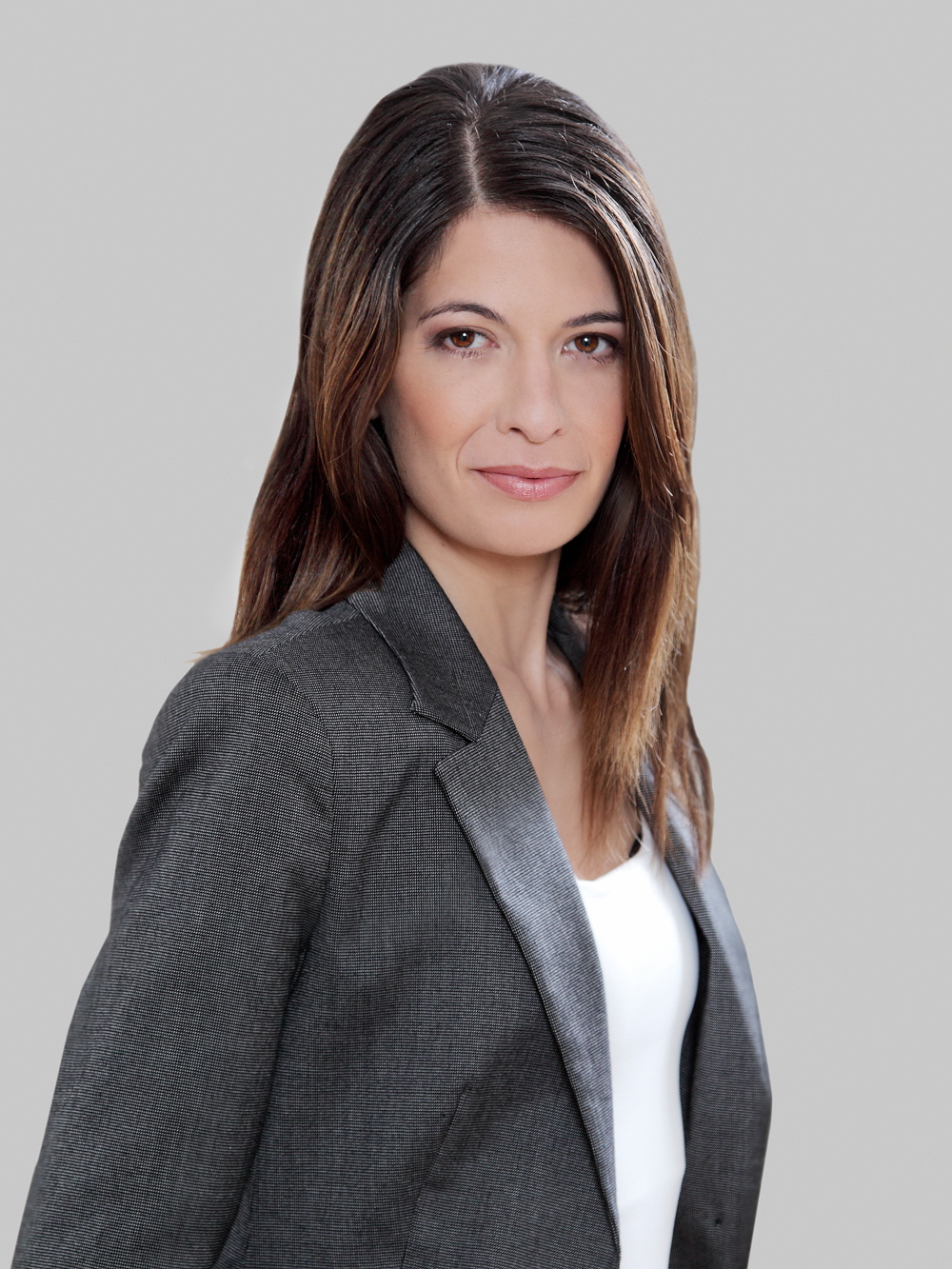
Linda Zervakis (episode 2)

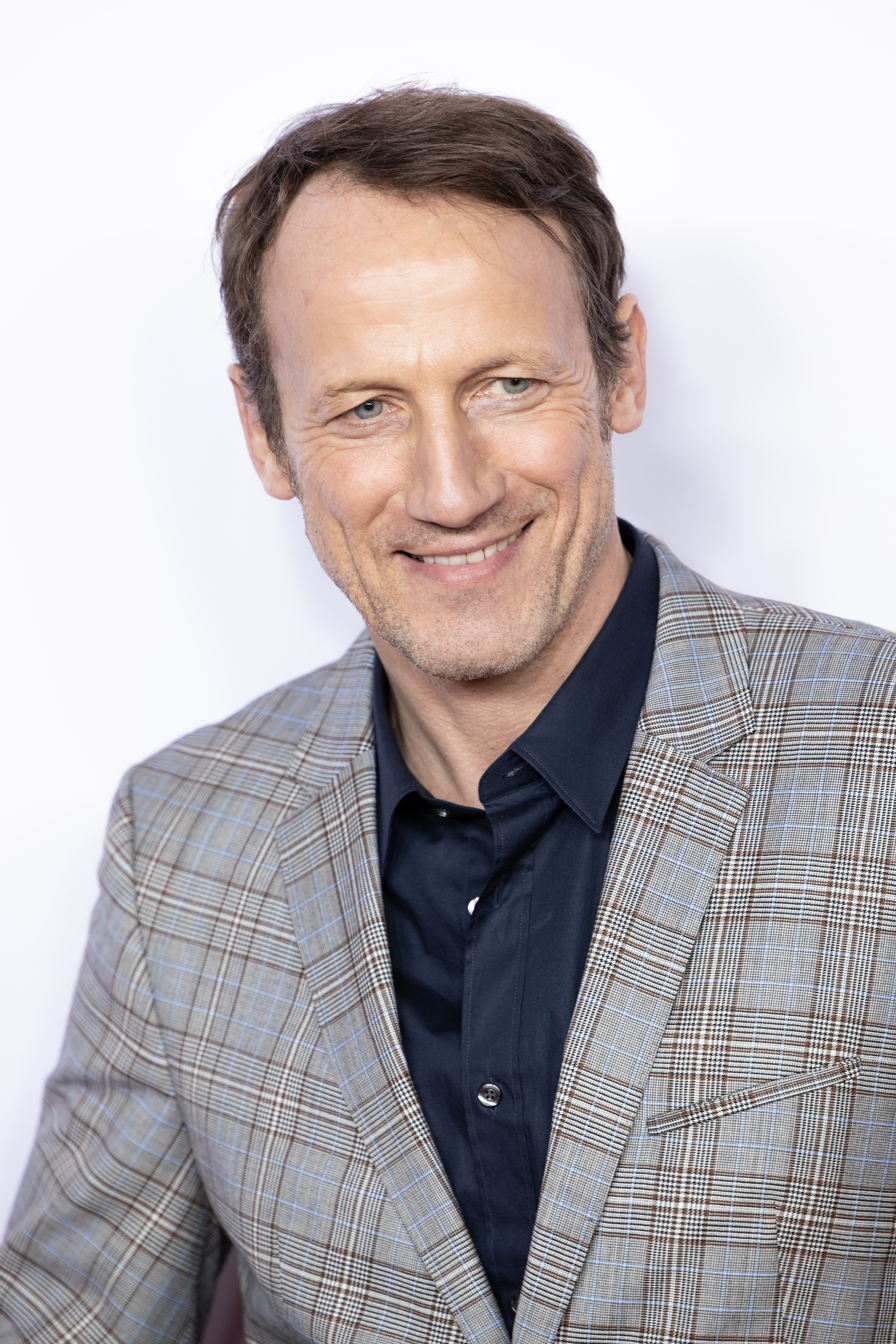
Wotan Wilke Möhring (episode 3)

Viviane Geppert (episode 4)

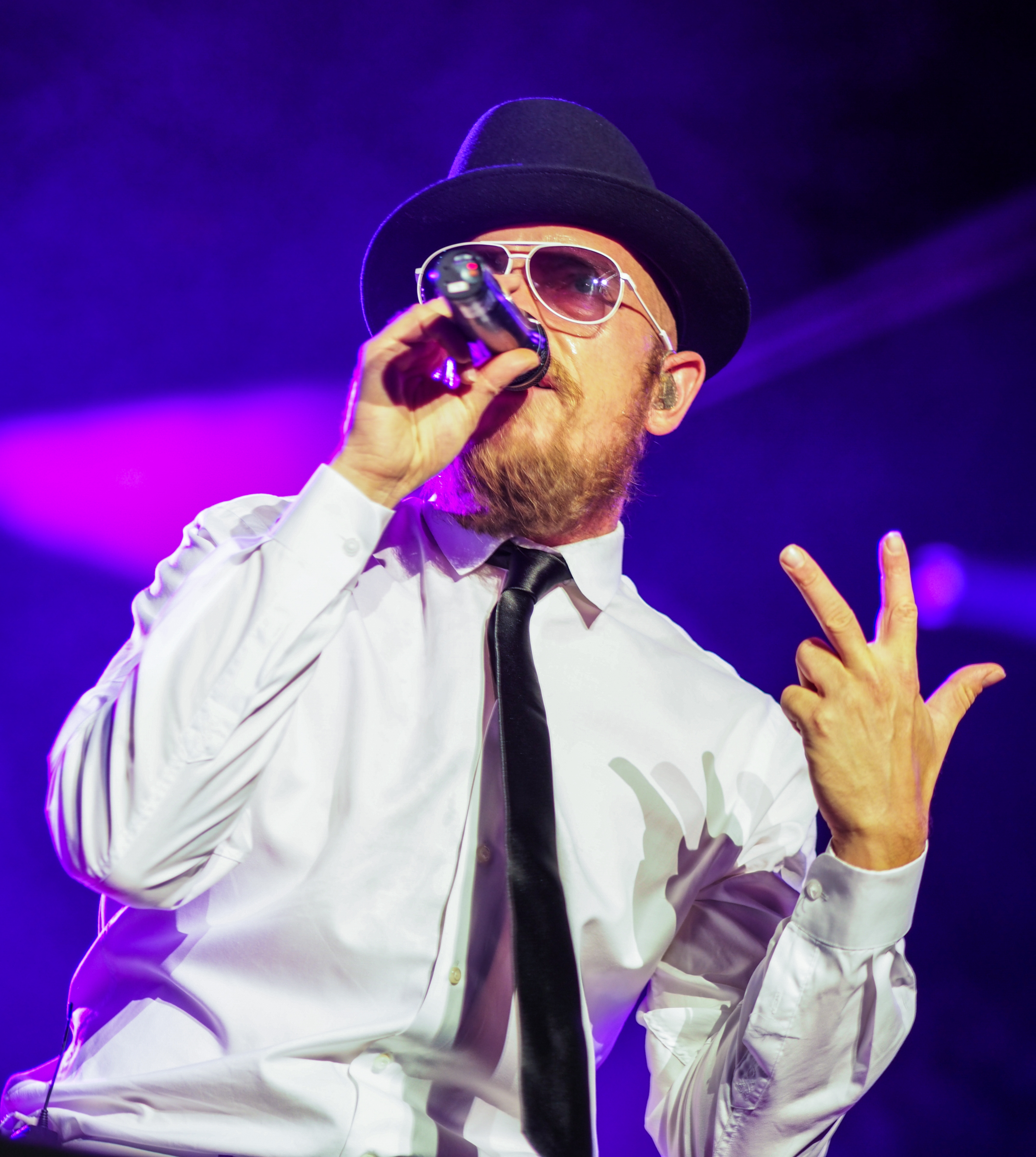
Jan Delay (episode 5)

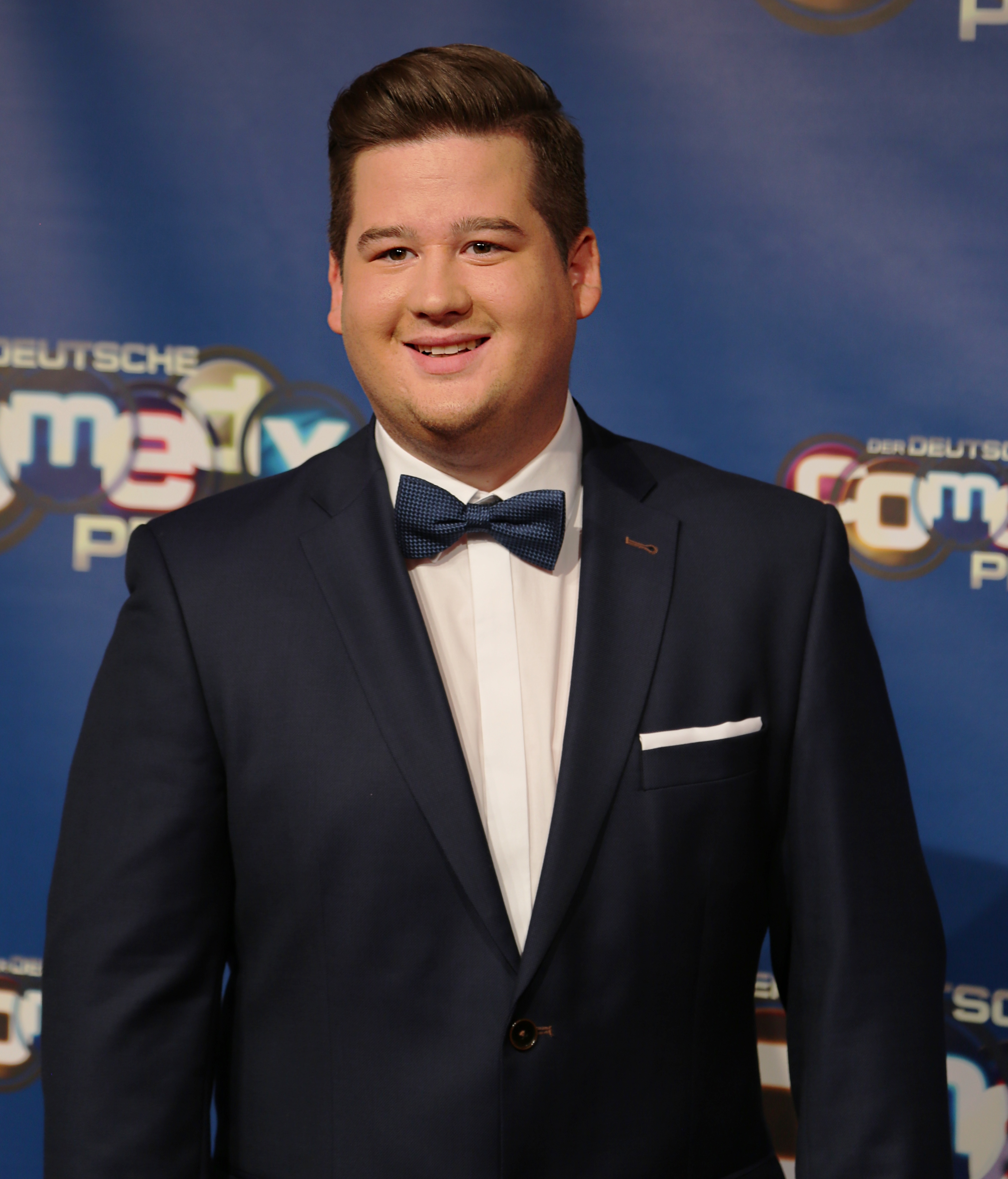
Chris Tall (episode 6)

Various guest panelists appeared as the third judge in the judging panel for one episode. These guest panelists included:

Episode	Panelist		Guest Panelist	Notability
1	Rick Kavanian	Palina Rojinski	Max Giesinger	Singer
2	Rick Kavanian	Palina Rojinski	Linda Zervakis	TV presenter
3	Rick Kavanian	Palina Rojinski	Wotan Wilke Möhring	Actor
4	Rick Kavanian	Palina Rojinski	Viviane Geppert	TV presenter
5	Rick Kavanian	Palina Rojinski	Jan Delay	Musician
6	Rick Kavanian	Palina Rojinski	Chris Tall	Comedian

== Contestants ==
The season features 8 contestants. In every week there is a guest mask who is unmasked immediately after their performance.

Results
Stage name	Celebrity	Notability	Live Episodes						
Stage name	Celebrity	Notability	1	2	3	4	5	6	
Stage name	Celebrity	Notability	1	2	3	4	5	A	B
Floh "Flea"	Mirja Boes	Comedienne	RISK	RISK	RISK	RISK	RISK	SAFE	WINNER
Flip Flops	Heiko & Roman Lochmann	Pop singers	WIN	WIN	WIN	WIN	WIN	SAFE	RUNNER-UP
Krokodil "Crocodile"	Sebastian Krumbiegel	Singer	WIN	WIN	WIN	WIN	RISK	THIRD	
Elgonia	Nadja Benaissa	Singer	WIN	WIN	WIN	RISK	OUT		
Robodog	Nazan Eckes	TV presenter	RISK	RISK	RISK	OUT			
Zuckerwatte "Cotton Candy"	Annett Louisan	Singer	RISK	RISK	OUT				
Baby Löwe "Baby Lion"	Uschi Glas	Actress	WIN	OUT					
Couchpotato	Hugo Egon Balder	TV presenter	OUT						
Mysterium	Rolando Villazón	Singer	GUEST						
Mysterium	Giovanni Zarrella	Singer		GUEST					
Mysterium	Stefanie Heinzmann	Singer			GUEST				
Mysterium	Vanessa Mai	Singer				GUEST			
Mysterium	Ireen Sheer	Singer					GUEST		
Mysterium	Michael Schulte	Singer							GUEST

The masked singer won their face-off and remained in the competition.
The masked singer lost their face-off and was in the bottom four/three/two, but was not eliminated.
The masked singer was safe from elimination.
The masked singer was eliminated from the competition and unmasked upon their elimination.
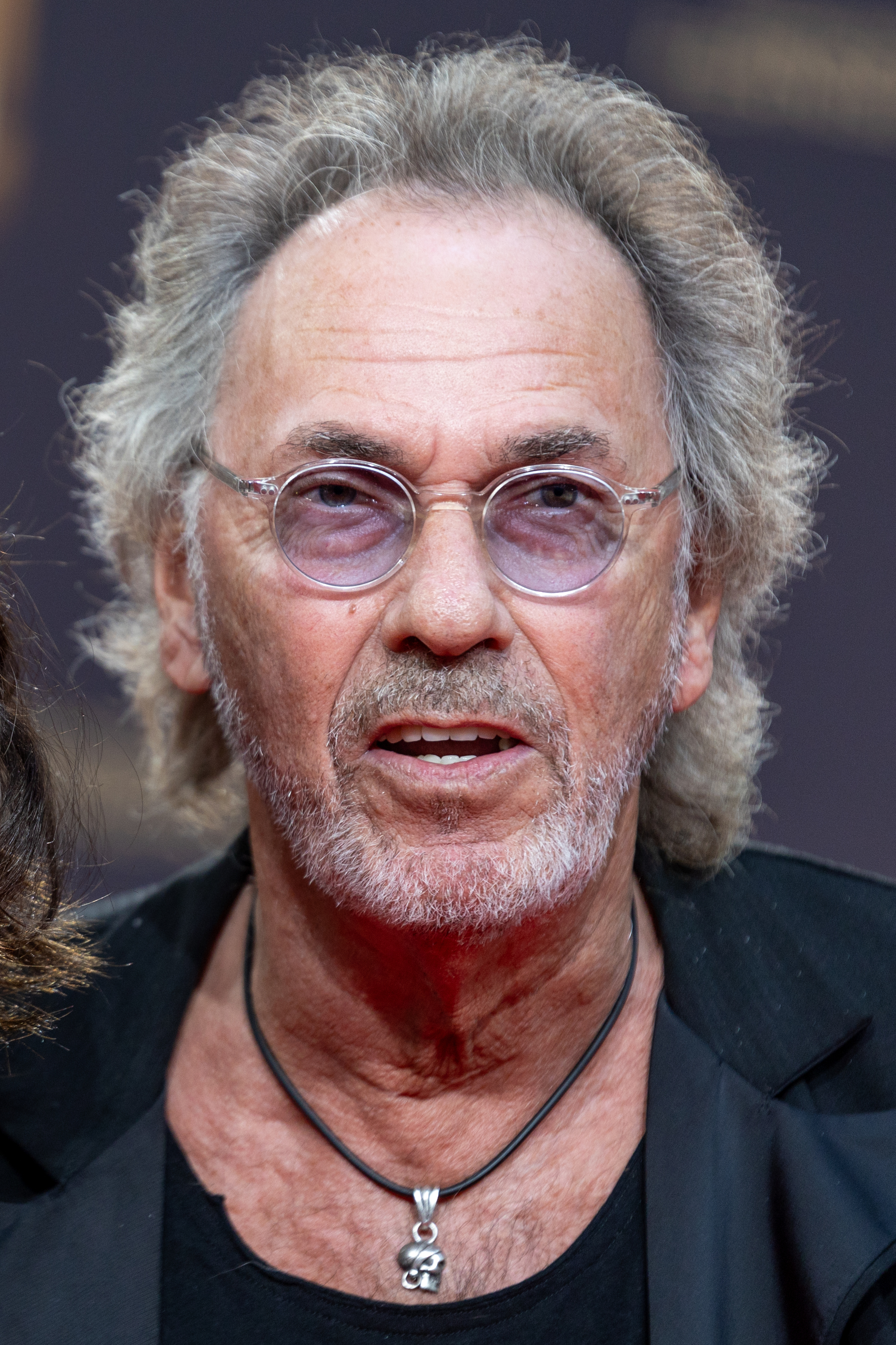
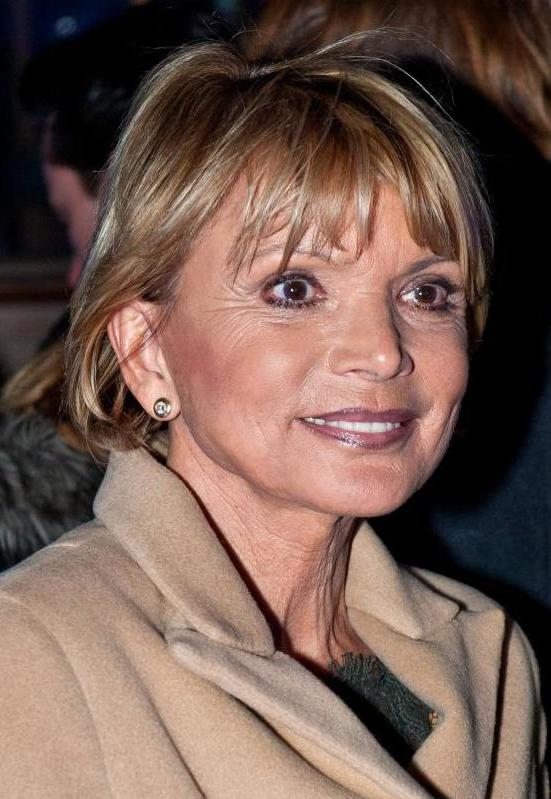
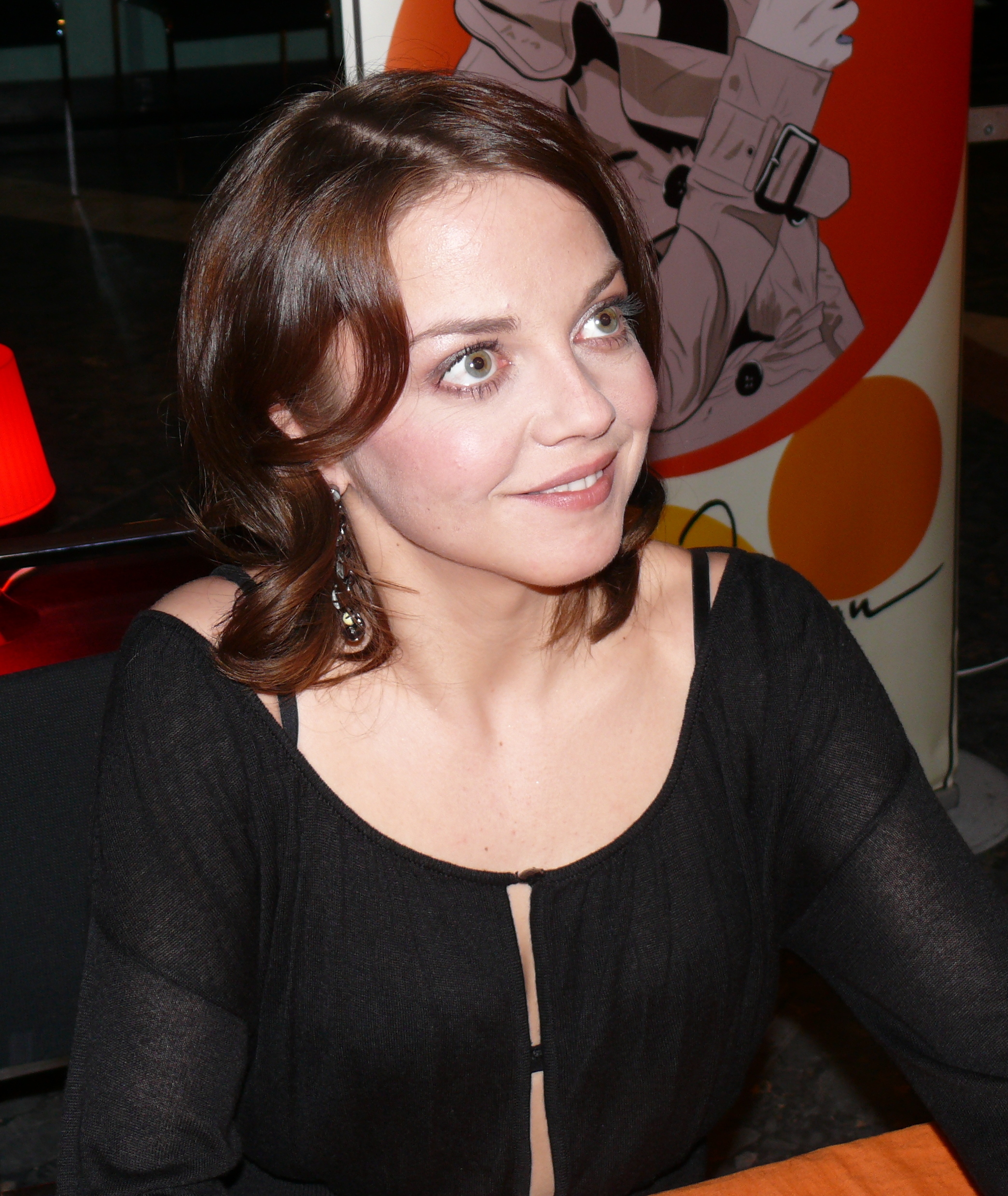
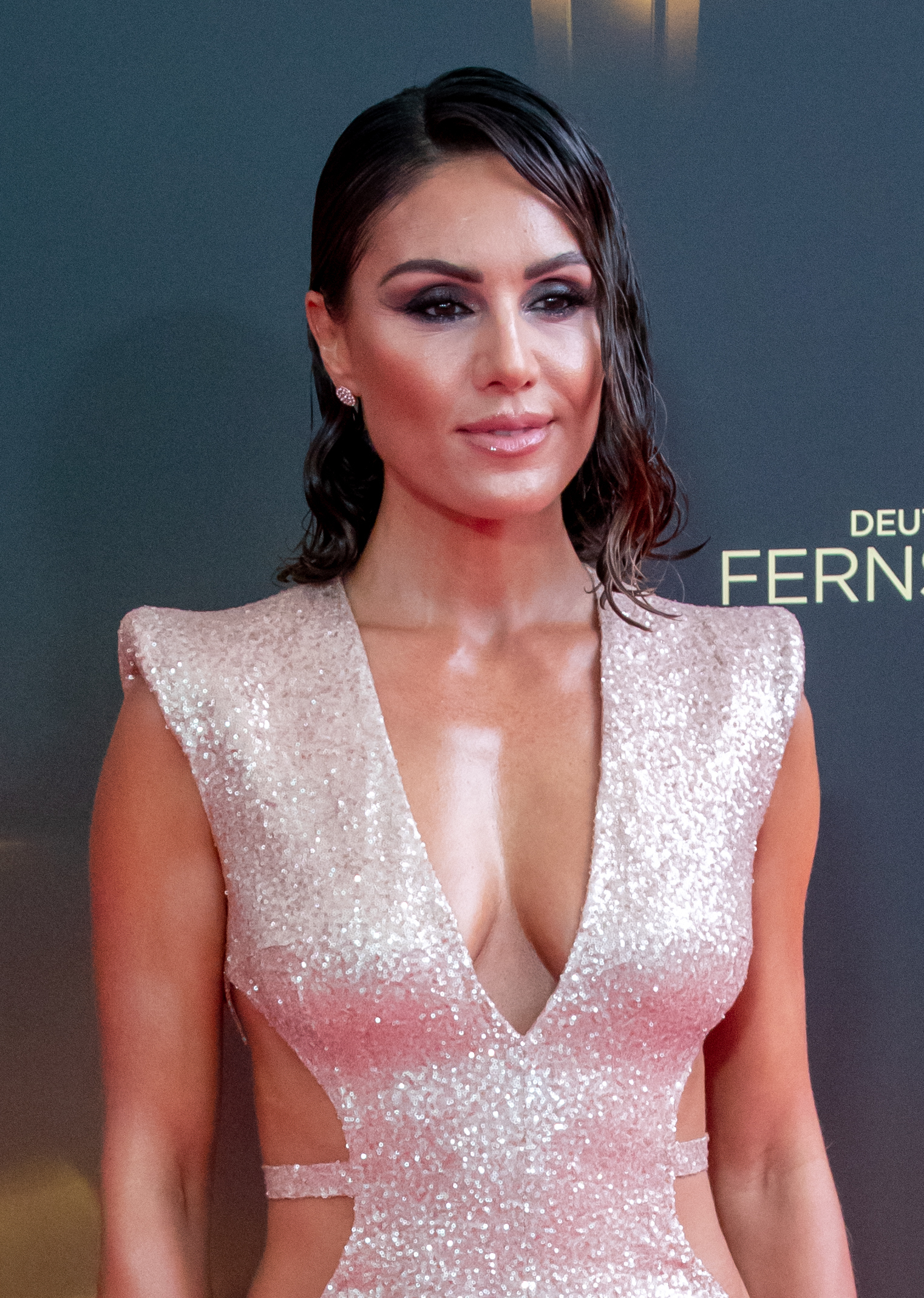
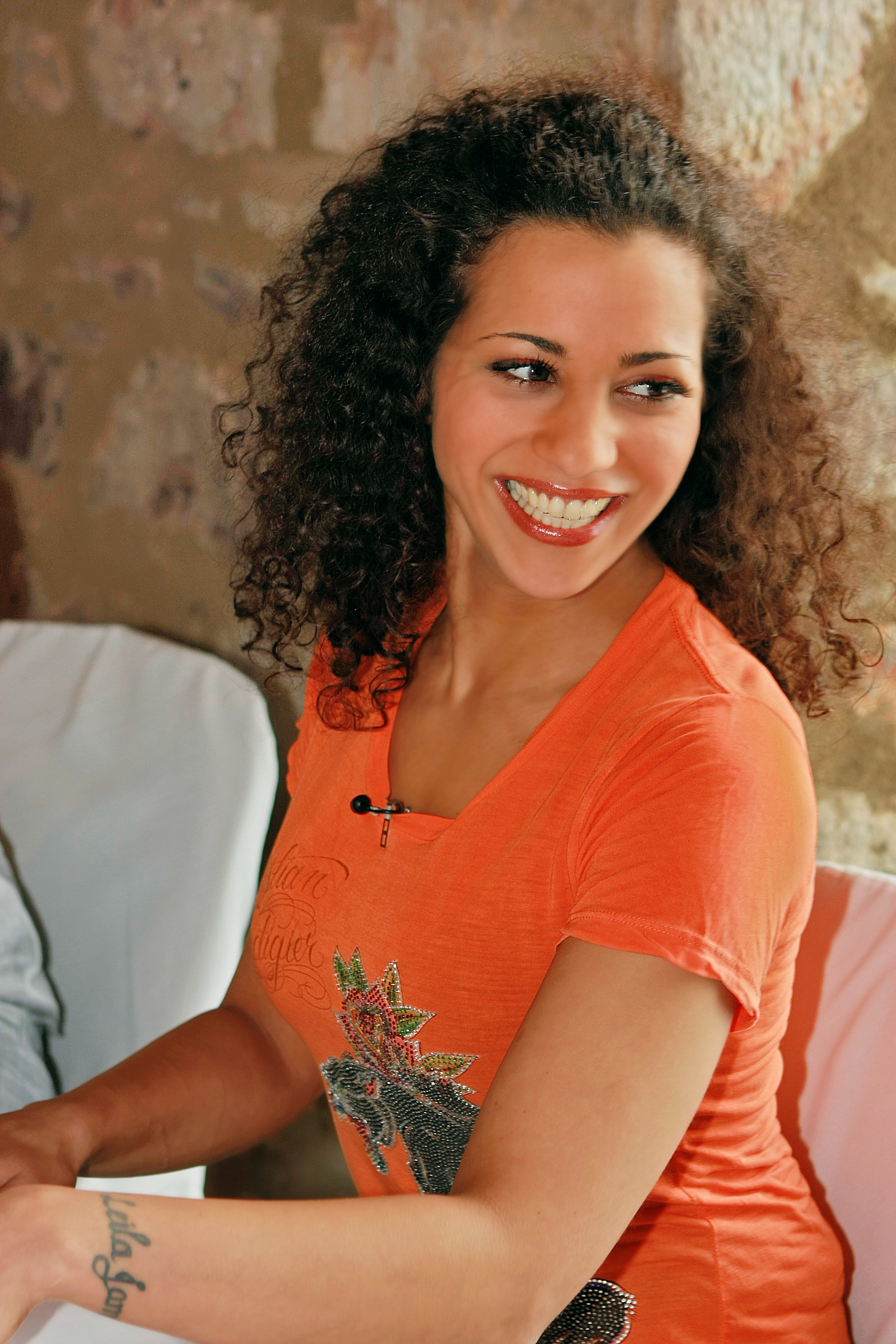
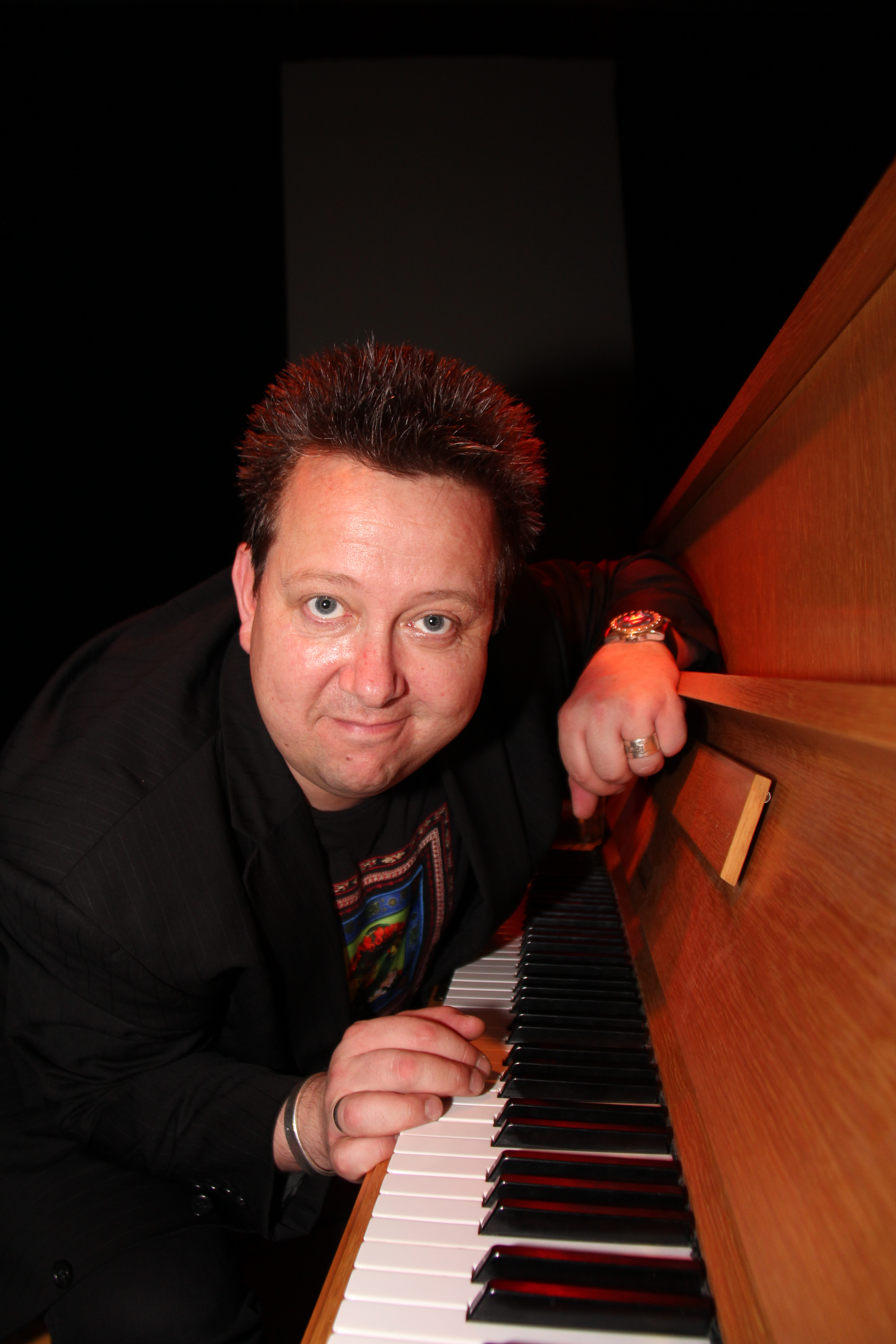
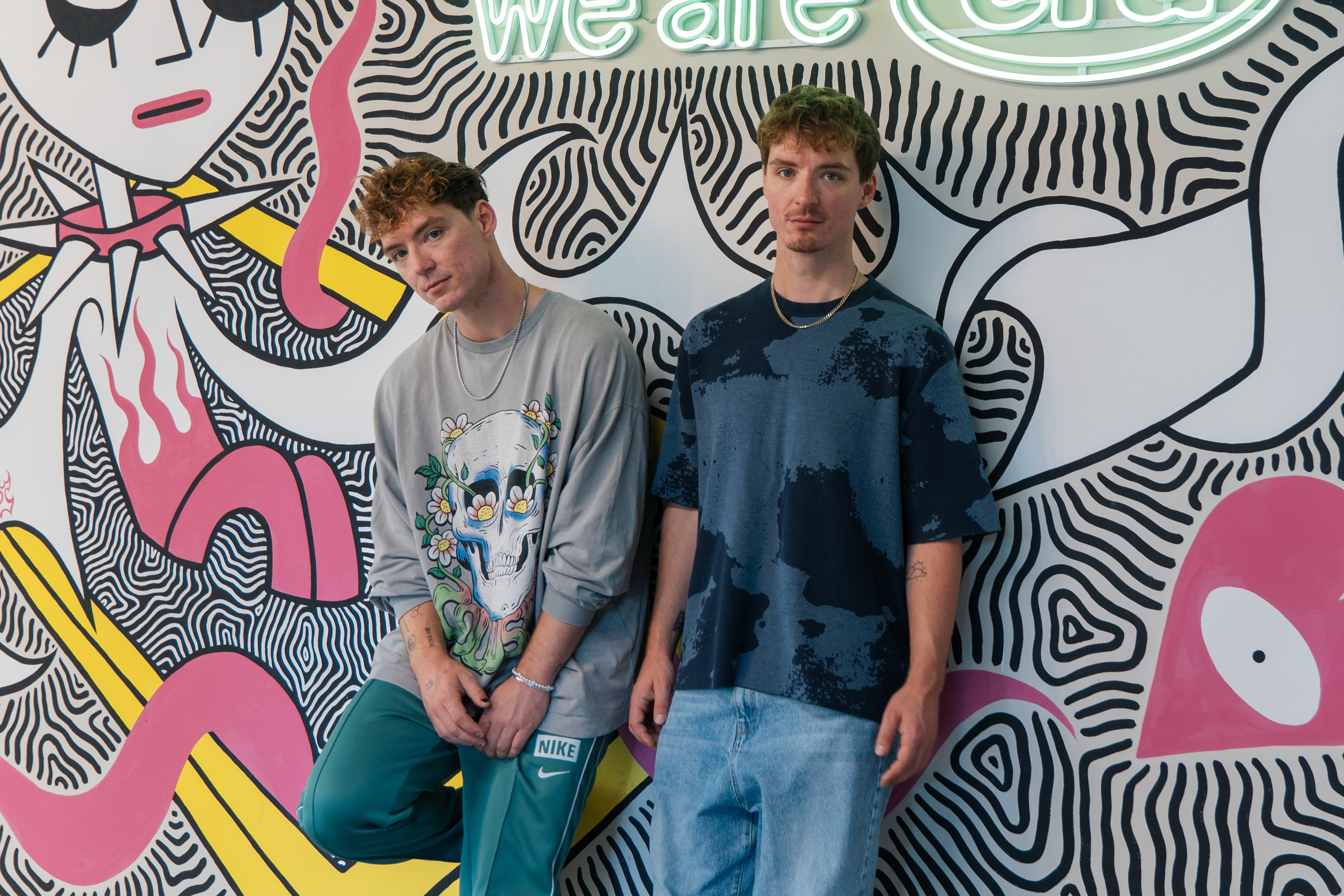
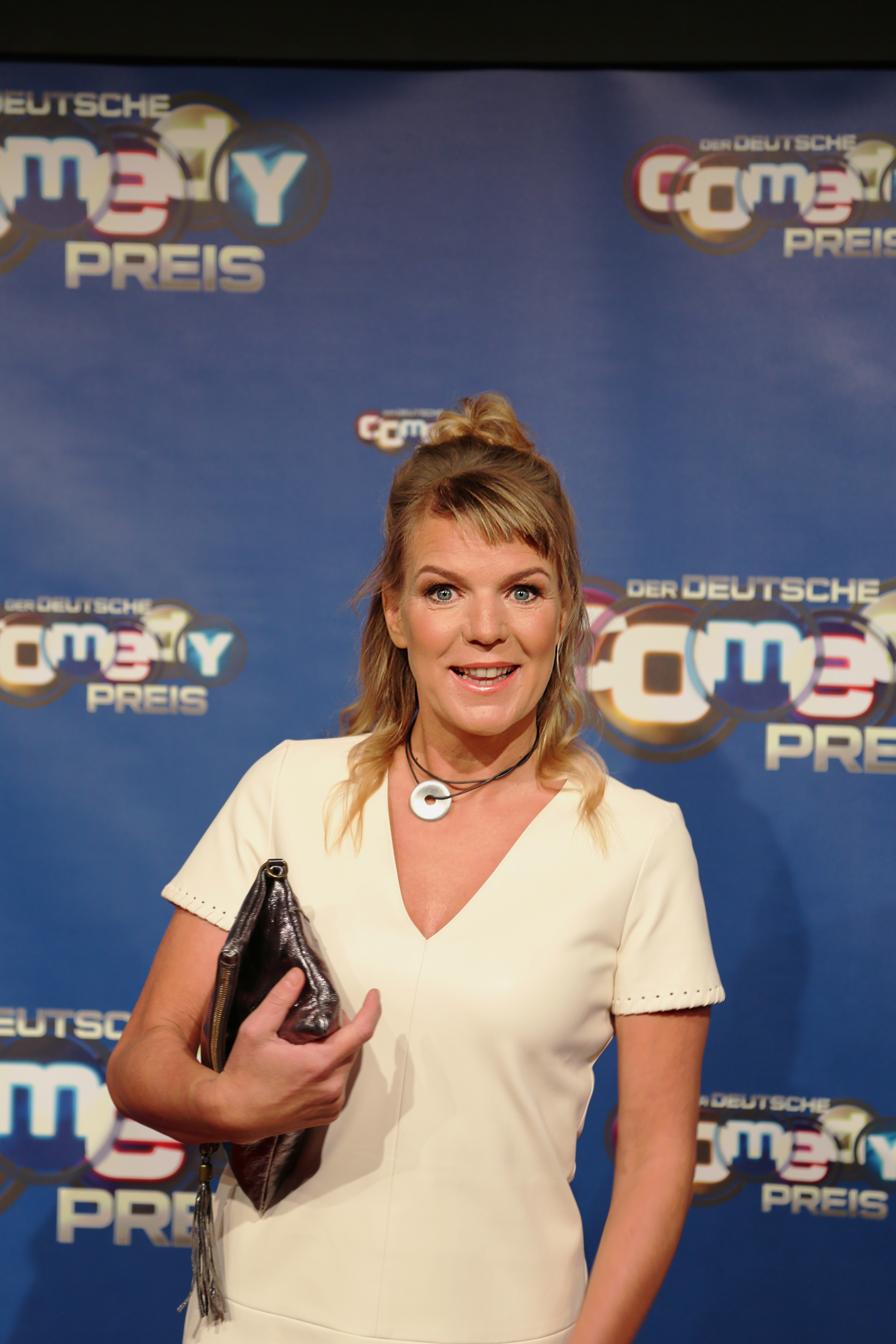
The celebrities who have competed in the tenth season of The Masked Singer, pictured in order of elimination (l-r):
Hugo Egon Balder ("Couchpotato"), Uschi Glas ("Baby Löwe"), Annett Louisan ("Zuckerwatte"), Nazan Eckes ("Robodog"), Nadia Benaissa ("Elgonia"), Sebastian Krumbiegel ("Krokodil"), Heiko & Roman Lochmann ("Flip Flops"), Mirja Boes ("Floh")
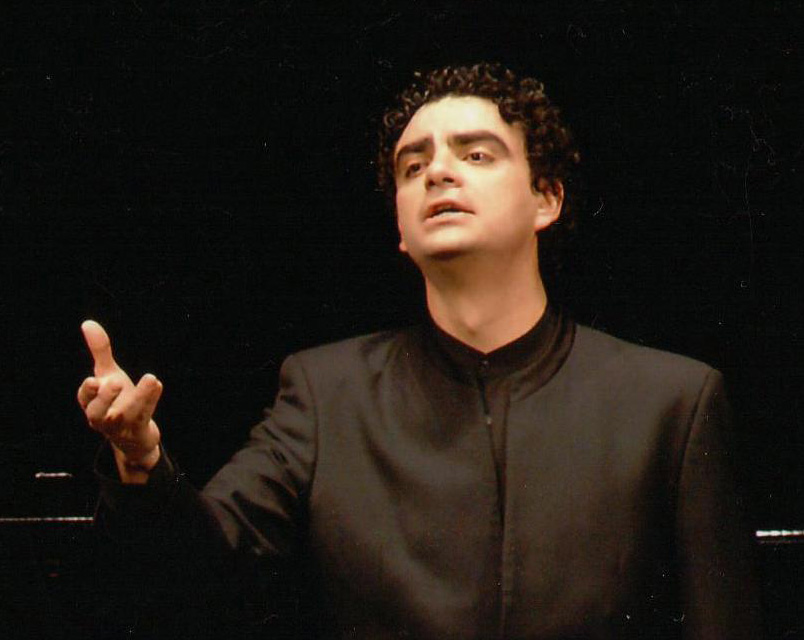
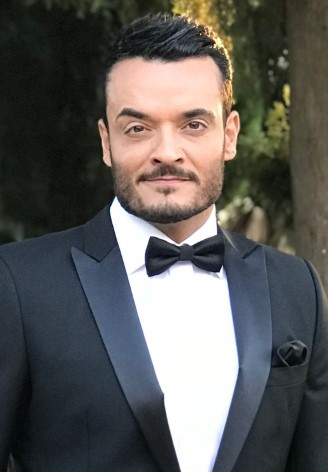
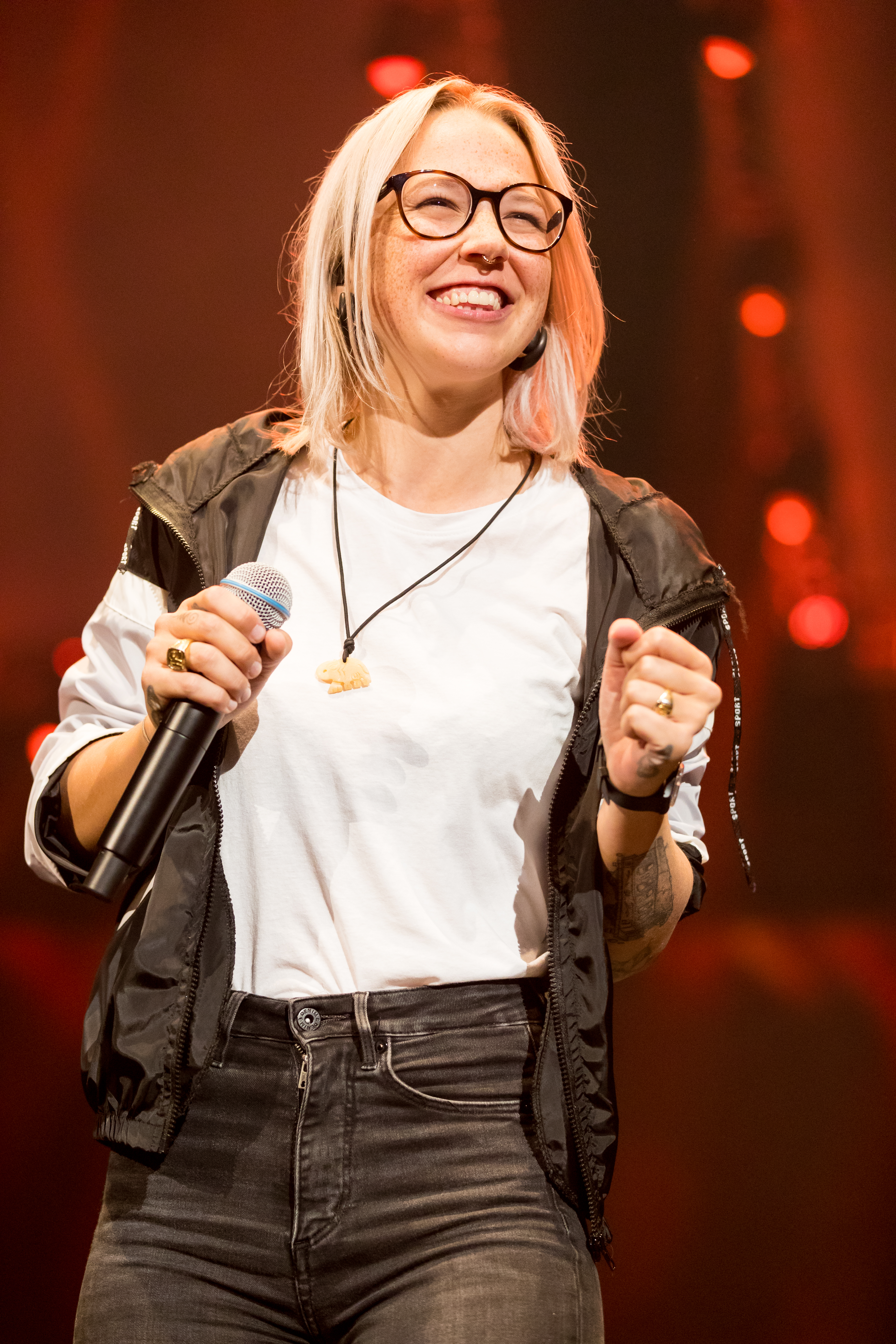
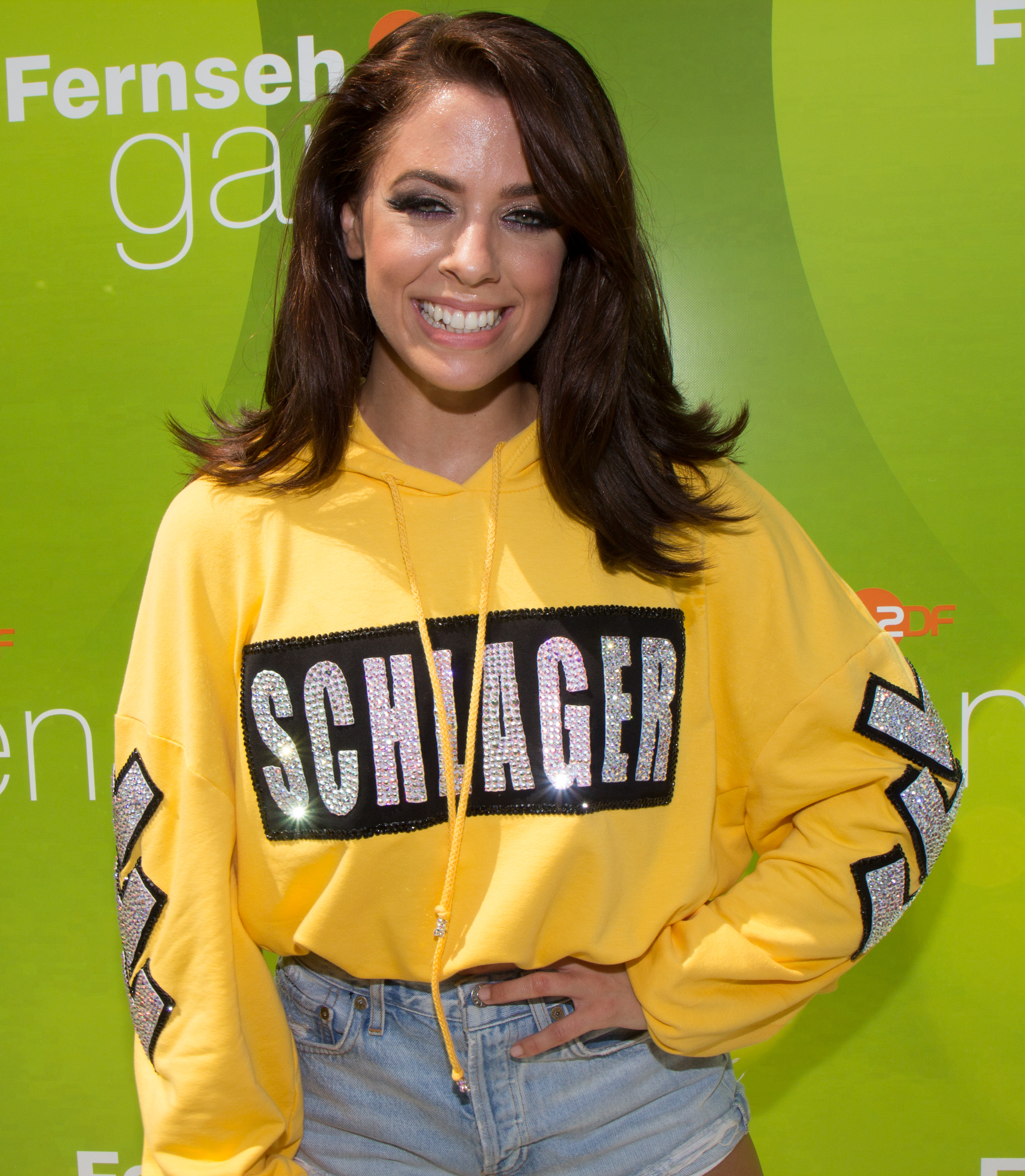
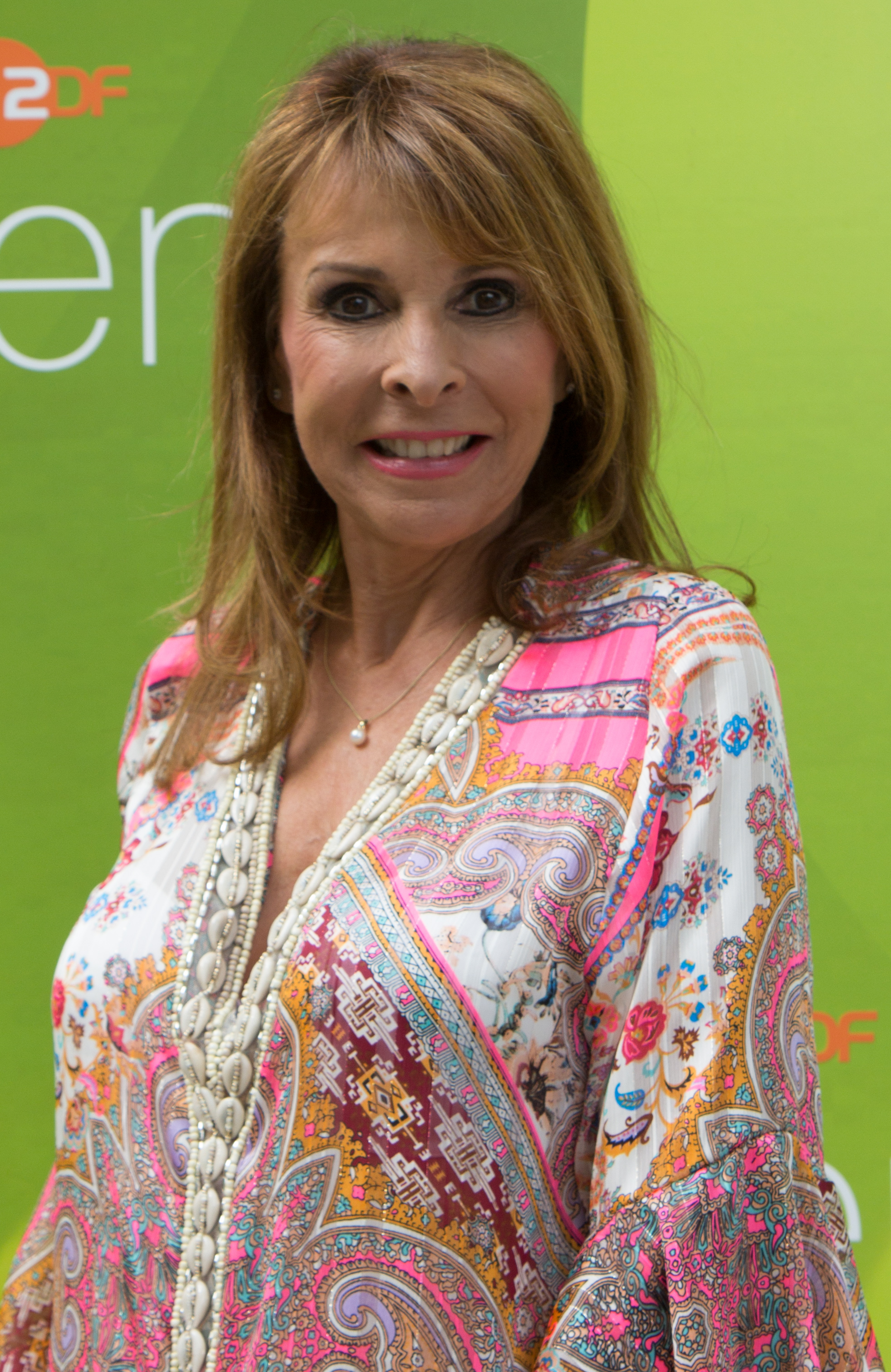
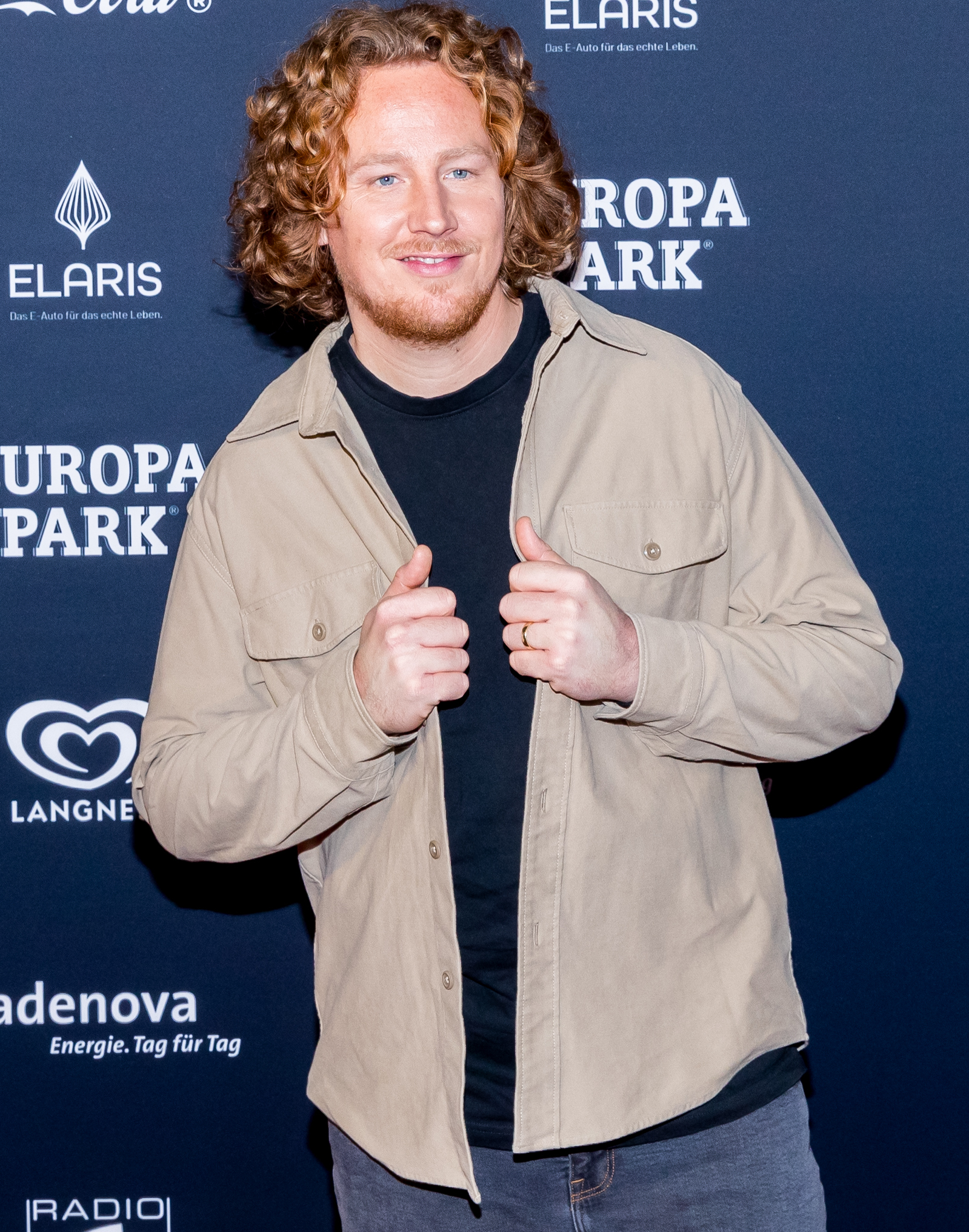
The celebrities who have competed as Mysterium, pictured in order of episode (l-r):
Rolando Villazón (episode 1), Giovanni Zarrella (episode 2), Stefanie Heinzmann (episode 3), Vanessa Mai (episode 4), Ireen Sheer (episode 5), Michael Schulte (episode 6)

== Episodes ==
=== Week 1 (6 April) ===
Performances on the first live episode
#	Stage name	Song	Identity	Result
1	Floh	"There's No Business Like Show Business" by Irving Berlin / "When Will I Be Famous?" by BROS	undisclosed	RISK
2	Krokodil	"Demons" by Imagine Dragons	undisclosed	WIN
3	Robodog	"From Zero to Hero" by Sarah Connor	undisclosed	RISK
4	Flip Flops	"Livin' La Vida Loca" by Ricky Martin	undisclosed	WIN
5	Mysterium	"Somebody To Love" by George Michael & Queen	Rolando Villazón	GUEST
6	Baby Löwe	"Big Big World" by Emilia	undisclosed	WIN
7	Zuckerwatte	"California Gurls" by Katy Perry	undisclosed	RISK
8	Couchpotato	"Three Lions" by David Baddiel & Frank Skinner/"Ghostbusters" by Ray Parker Jr.	Hugo Egon Balder	OUT
9	Elgonia	"Kiss From a Rose" by Seal	undisclosed	WIN

=== Week 2 (13 April) ===
Performances on the second live episode
#	Stage name	Song	Identity	Result
1	Elgonia	"She Works Hard for the Money" by Donna Summer	undisclosed	WIN
2	Krokodil	"The World Is Not Enough" by Garbage	undisclosed	WIN
3	Baby Löwe	"Baby Love" by The Supremes	Uschi Glas	OUT
4	Floh	"ME!" by Taylor Swift	undisclosed	RISK
5	Mysterium	"Shape Of My Heart" by Backstreet Boys	Giovanni Zarrella	GUEST
6	Zuckerwatte	"Thunderstruck" by AC/DC	undisclosed	RISK
7	Robodog	"Push the Button" by Sugababes	undisclosed	RISK
8	Flip Flops	"Mr. Brightside" by The Killers	undisclosed	WIN

- Before the last Voting is official, Giovanni Zarrella sings: "Danza" by Giovanni Zarrella

=== Week 3 (20 April) ===
Performances on the third live episode
#	Stage name	Song		Theme/Motto	Identity	Result
1	Zuckerwatte	"Houdini" by Dua Lipa	"Barbie Girl" by Aqua	Radio Hits	Annett Louisan	OUT
2	Krokodile	"Poison" by Alice Cooper	"Barbie Girl" by Aqua	Radio Hits	undisclosed	WIN
3	Elgonia	"It Must Have Been Love" by Roxette	"The Power of Love" by Huey Lewis	Film Hits	undisclosed	WIN
4	Robodog	"A Dream Is a Wish Your Heart Makes" by Ilene Woods	"The Power of Love" by Huey Lewis	Film Hits	undisclosed	RISK
5	Mysterium	"Before You Go" by Lewis Capaldi		N/A	Stefanie Heinzmann	GUEST
6	Flip Flops	"Club Tropicana" by Wham!	"Murder on the Dancefloor" by Sophie Ellis-Bextor	Disco Hits	undisclosed	WIN
7	Floh	"Your Disco Needs You" by Kylie Minogue	"Murder on the Dancefloor" by Sophie Ellis-Bextor	Disco Hits	undisclosed	RISK

=== Week 4 (27 April) ===
Performances on the fourth live episode
#	Stage name	Song		Identity	Result
1	Flip Flops	"Beggin" by Maneskin		undisclosed	WIN
2	Elgonia	"Hung Up" by Madonna		undisclosed	RISK
3	Floh	"That's What Friends Are For" by Dionne Warwick		undisclosed	RISK
4	Mysterium	"Texas Hold 'Em" by Beyonce		Vanessa Mai	GUEST
5	Robodog	"Crush" by Jennifer Paige		undisclosed	RISK
6	Krokodil	"The Wild Boys" by Duran Duran		undisclosed	WIN
Sing-off details			Style	Identity	Result
1	Floh	"Mamma Mia" by ABBA	Hard Rock	undisclosed	SAFE
2	Elgonia	"If I Could Turn Back Time" by Cher	Ballade	undisclosed	SAFE
3	Robodog	"Shape of You" by Ed Sheeran	Bollywood	Nazan Eckes	OUT

=== Week 5 (4 May) ===
Performances on the fifth live episode
#	Stage name	Song	Identity	Result
1	Elgonia	"My Immortal" by Evanescence	undisclosed	RISK
2	Floh	"Walking on Sunshine" by Katrina and the Waves/"L'Italiano" by Toto Cutugno	undisclosed	RISK
3	Flip Flops	"Billie Jean" by Michael Jackson	undisclosed	WIN
4	Krokodil	"The Final Countdown" by Europe	undisclosed	RISK
Sing-off details			Identity	Result
5	Floh	"Reality" by Richard Sanderson	undisclosed	SAFE
6	Krokodil	"Killer Queen" by Queen	undisclosed	SAFE
7	Elgonia	"I Look to You" by Whitney Houston	Nadja Benaissa	OUT
8	Mysterium	"Moon River" by Audrey Hepburn	Ireen Sheer	GUEST

=== Week 6 (18 May) - Final ===
- Group number: "Viva La Vida" by Coldplay

==== Round One ====
Performances on the final live episode – Round one
#	Stage name	Song	Identity	Result
1	Floh	"Thank You for the Music" by ABBA	undisclosed	SAFE
2	Krokodil	"November Rain" by Guns N' Roses	Sebastian Krumbiegel	THIRD
3	Flip Flops	"Heart Skips a Beat" by Olly Murs	undisclosed	SAFE

==== Round Two ====
Performances on the final live episode – Round two
#	Stage name	Song (Duet with Mystery)	Identity	Result
1	Flip Flops	"Mr. Brightside" by The Killers	N/A	N/A
2	Floh	"There's No Business Like Show Business" by Irving Berlin	N/A	N/A
3	Mysterium	"Say Something" by A Great Big World ft. Christina Aguilera	Michael Schulte	GUEST

==== Round Three ====
Performances on the final live episode – Round three
#	Stage name	Song	Identity	Result
1	Floh	"Everlasting Love" by Robert Knight	Mirja Boes	WINNER
2	Flip Flops	"Nothing Compares 2 U" by Sinéad O'Connor	Heiko & Roman Lochmann	RUNNER-UP

== Reception ==
=== Ratings ===
Episode	Original airdate	Timeslot	Viewers (in millions)		Share (in %)		Source
Episode	Original airdate	Timeslot	Household	Adults 14–49	Household	Adults 14–49	Source
1	6 April 2024	Saturday 8:15 pm	1.46	0.67	6.9	15.5	
2	13 April 2024	Saturday 8:15 pm	1.23	0.48	5.8	11.4	
3	20 April 2024	Saturday 8:15 pm	1.38	0.55	6.2	11.8	
4	27 April 2024	Saturday 8:15 pm	1.24	0.49	5.9	12.0	
5	4 May 2024	Saturday 8:15 pm	1.17	0.42	5.6	9.7	
6	18 May 2024	Saturday 8:15 pm	1.38	0.51	7.2	14.0	
Average			1.31	0.52	6.3	12.4	
