= Es ist Liebe =

Single by Nadja Benaissa

from the album Schritt für Schritt
- Released: 12 September 2005
- Length: 3:57
- Label: Universal
- Songwriter(s): Nadja Benaissa; Tino Oac
- Producer(s): Tino Oac

Nadja Benaissa singles chronology
| "Es ist Liebe" (2005) | "Ich hab dich" (2006) |

"Es ist Liebe" (English: It Is Love) is a song by German recording artist Nadja Benaissa. It was written by Benaissa and Tino Oac for her debut solo album Schritt für Schritt (2006), while production was helmed by Oac. Released as the album's lead single, it debuted and peaked at number 64 on the German Singles Chart.

== Track listings ==
CD single
| No. | Title | Length |
|---|---|---|
| 1. | "Es ist Liebe" (Radio Version) | 4:15 |
| 2. | "Es ist Liebe" (Instrumental Version) | 4:15 |

Maxi single
| No. | Title | Length |
|---|---|---|
| 1. | "Es ist Liebe" (Radio Version) | 4:15 |
| 2. | "Es ist Liebe" (Album Version) | 4:32 |
| 3. | "Es ist Liebe" (Instrumental Version) | 4:15 |
| 4. | "Es ist Liebe" (Video) | 4:15 |

== Credits and personnel ==
- Suanne Bader – brass
- Nadja Benaissa – lead vocals, lyrics, music
- Ulf Hattwig – mastering
- Alex Nies – drums
- Tini Oac – mixing, production, recording
- Woolf Schönecker – guitar
- Florian Sitzmann – mixing, organ

== Charts ==
| Chart (2005) | Peak position |
|---|---|
| Germany (GfK) | 64 |
