= Nadja Benaissa =

German singer

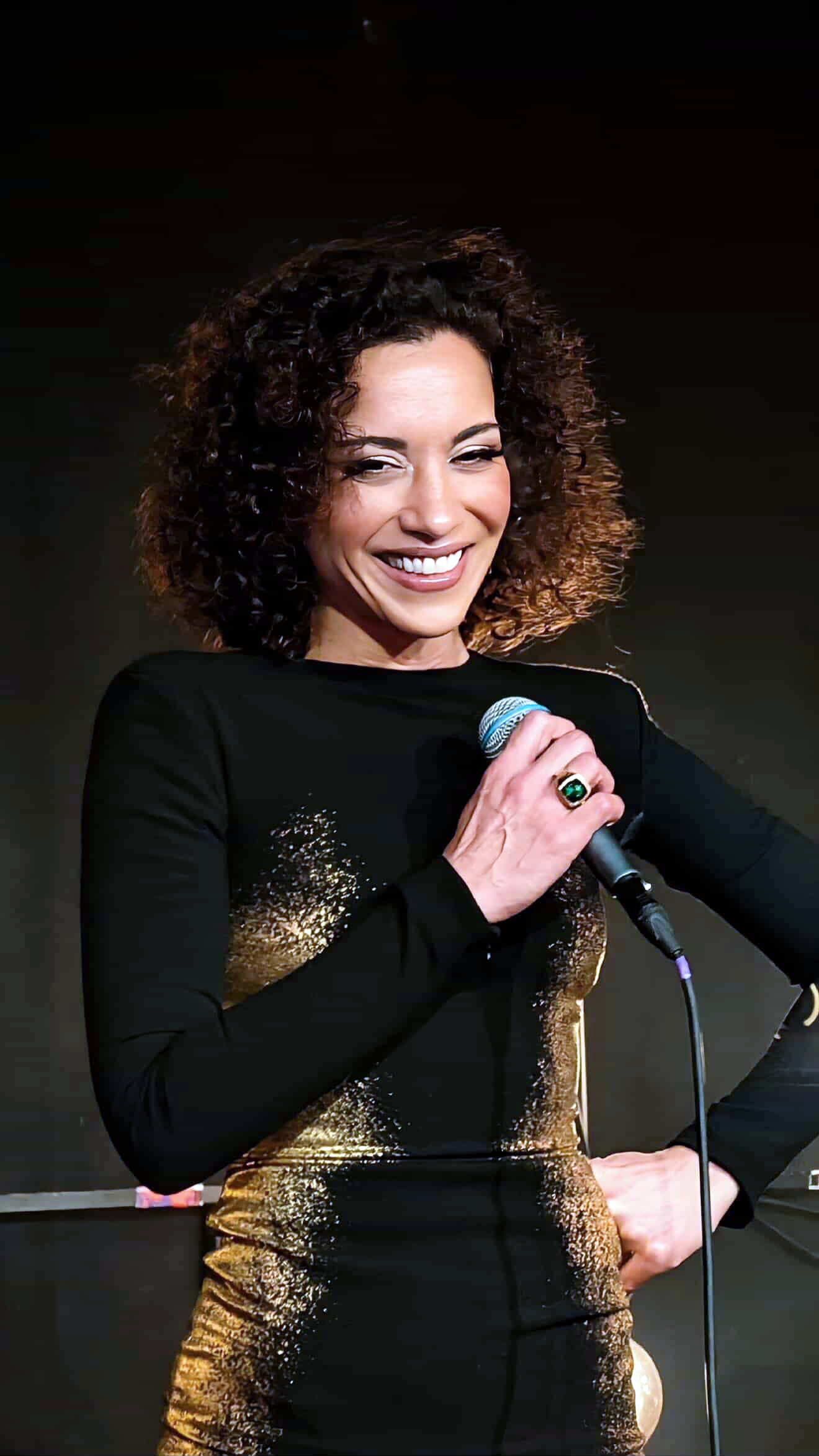
- Benaissa in 2026
- Born: 26 April 1982 (age 44); Frankfurt, West Germany
- Occupations: Singer; songwriter; television personality
- Years active: 2000–present
- Children: 1
- Website: nadjabenaissa.de

Nadja Benaissa (born 26 April 1982) is a German singer, songwriter and television personality. She first gained public recognition in 2000 as a contestant on the German adaption of the reality television show Popstars, through which she became a member of No Angels, one of the most commercially successful girl groups of European origin. During the group's initial hiatus, she pursued a solo career, releasing the solo album Schritt für Schritt (2007), which included the top 40 single "Ich hab dich," and represented Hesse in the Bundesvision Song Contest 2006 with the song, finishing in fourth place.

Following the reunion of No Angels in 2007, Benaissa remained with the group until 2010. That year, she departed after legal proceedings that resulted in a suspended sentence related to personal conduct, an episode that temporarily affected her public career. She subsequently published her autobiography Alles wird gut and withdrew from the entertainment industry for much of the remainder of the decade. Benaissa returned to music in 2019 as a member of the a cappella group Medlz, recording two studio albums with the ensemble, but left in 2021 to rejoin No Angels for their 20th anniversary celebrations.

== Life and career ==
=== Early life ===
Born in Frankfurt, Benaissa is the second child born to a Moroccan father, Muhamed Benaissa, and a mother of mixed Serbian and German ethnicity, Sabina. Raised alongside her brother Amin who is three years older, she spent much of her childhood in Langen, where her parents worked in the catering business, and she attended the Geschwister-Scholl-Schule.

At the age of nine, Benaissa began playing instruments, learning the piano and the flute. Her early musical interest grew after having auditioned and won a role in the school stage musical Tabaluga during her first year at the Dreieich-Schule-Langen. In her early teenage years, she began writing songs, and at the age of 13 Benaissa started performing in several cover bands within the Frankfurt area, eventually winning the second place at Jugend musiziert, a supraregional music contest for youths.

Benaissa was diagnosed with HIV when she was 17 during a routine screening after she became pregnant. On 25 October 1999, at the age of 17, Benaissa gave birth to her daughter Leila Jamila, an event which she describes as "the proudest moment of [her] life". Although Benaissa and her boyfriend ended their relationship, Benaissa began attending evening classes in pursuit of her Realschulabschluss school certificate.

=== 2000–2003: Breakthrough with No Angels ===
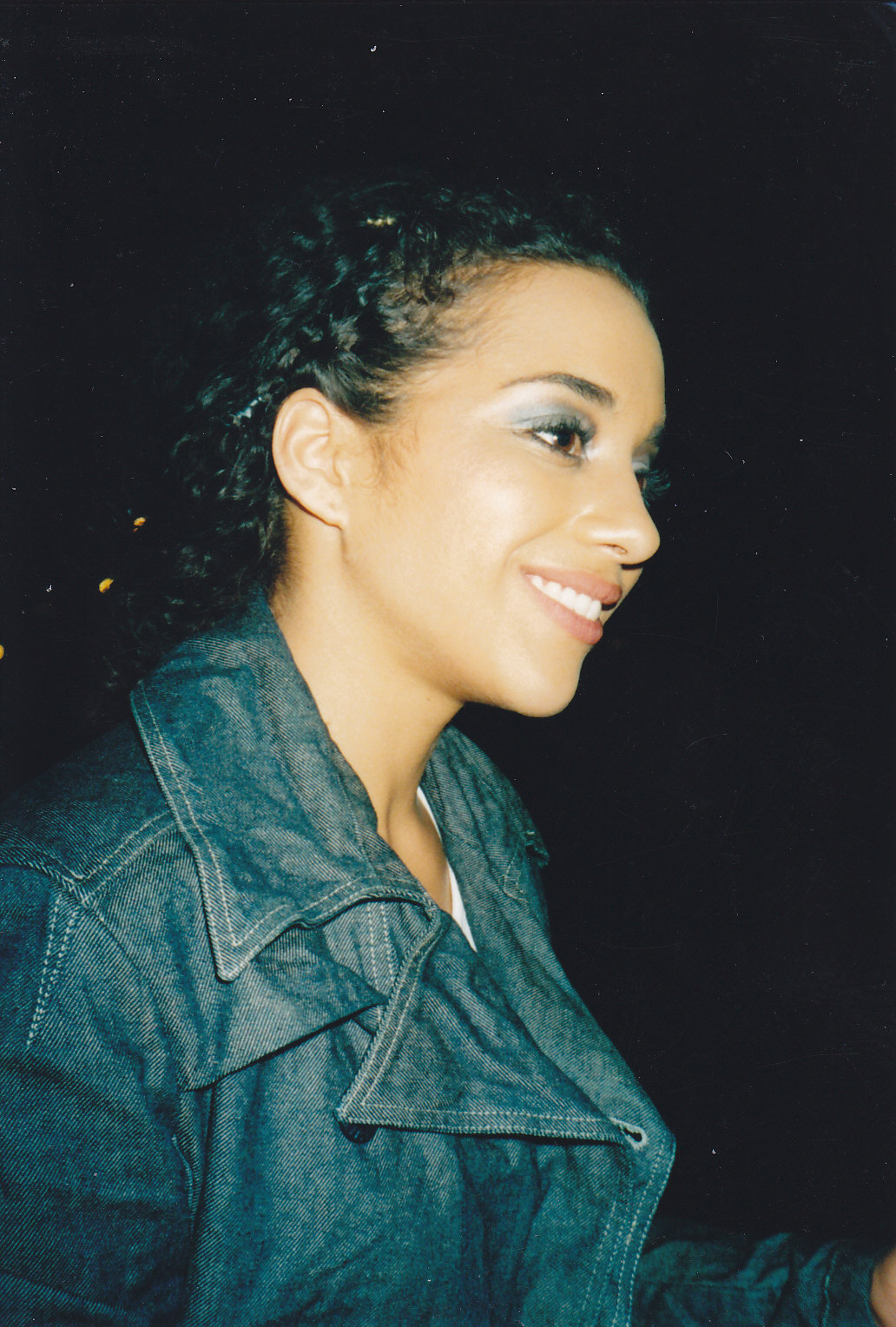
Benaissa in 2002

In mid-2000, Benaissa, along with thousands of other women, applied for the debut installment of the German reality television program Popstars, a talent show looking to put together an all-female band. Sailing through the selection process, judges Simone Angel, Rainer Moslener and Mario M. Mendrzycki were generally impressed by her performances, which earned her a position in the top ten finalists despite her struggle with dancing choreography. During a special episode in November 2000, jury member Angel eventually disclosed that Benaissa had been selected to become part of the final five-member girl group No Angels. Initially hesitant about signing a recording contract which would force her to leave her baby daughter with her parents, the show's producers remained persuasive and Benaissa eventually agreed on joining the band.

With the final five members of the band in place, Popstars continued tracking the development and struggles of the group who left homes to move into a shared flat near Munich, Bavaria. However, it took another four months until the band released their debut single "Daylight in Your Eyes", which would subsequently appear on the band's debut album Elle'ments (2001). Both the single and the album became an unexpected but record-breaking success, when both instantly entered the top position on the Austrian, German and Swiss Media Control singles, albums and airplay charts, giving No Angels one of the most successful debuts in years. Suffering from the separation from her daughter, Benaissa burned out within months, a subject on which she later commented:

"I was completely unprepared, overwhelmed with the work and the fame. I enjoyed being with the girls, singing, recording, but it was more about keeping the media interested – there was always a camera in your face. And I had no time for my daughter."

Nevertheless, Benaissa decided to remain with the band, and in the following years No Angels released another two number-one studio albums, Now... Us! and Pure, a live album and a successful swing album branded When the Angels Swing, totalling twelve singles altogether – including four-number one singles. Eventually selling more than five million singles and albums worldwide, No Angels became the best-selling German girl band to date and the most successful girl group of continental Europe between the years of 2001 and 2003. On 5 September 2003, the four remaining members of the band (Jessica Wahls had left the band following the birth of her first child in February 2003) announced that they would no longer be performing together after three years of continual touring and increasing cases of illness. The release of The Best of No Angels in November of the same year marked the end of the band, with each member going their separate ways in early 2004.

=== 2005–2006: Launching a solo career ===
While her former bandmates pursued solo careers in music and television, Benaissa, who had suffered from intense sleep deprivation, decided to focus on her recovered motherhood the following months. In fall 2004, however, she signed a solo contract with the urban music division of Universal Music and started work on her debut album. Encouraged to perform soul and R&B music with lyrics in German language after a 2001 participation in the Sisters Keepers project's single "Liebe & Verstand", Benaissa decided to focus on writing songs with German lyrics only. As a result, she released her first solo single, "Es ist Liebe", produced by Tino Oac, in September 2005. The Motown-inspired ballad received positive reception from music critics, but failed to reach the top 50 of the German Singles Chart.

In the fall of 2005 Benaissa went on tour as a supporting act for the German leg of Simply Red – In Concert. Afterwards she prepared the release of her second single "Ich hab dich", which was chosen to represent Hesse on the 2nd Bundesvision Song Contest. Benaissa eventually finished fourth with 104 points, while the single entered at number 36 on the German Singles Chart. Two weeks later Schritt für Schritt was released, yet barely reaching the top 70. In June 2006, Benaissa participated in another non-profit-making aid project when she provided vocals for the Fury in the Slaughterhouse cover, "Won't Forget These Days", released during the 2006 FIFA World Cup.

=== 2007–2017: Reformation of the band and legal problems ===
Although Benaissa was preparing her second studio album for a February 2007 release, involving production by German producers Audiotreats, DJ Desue, Loomis Green, MRF Entertainment, and Monroe among others, she decided to postpone the release in favour of a reunion of No Angels on their fourth studio album Destiny in early 2007. However, as all four band members had settled on the continuation of solo projects, Benaissa entered Berlin recording studios in January 2008 to record at least 15 new demo songs, including material she already penned in 2003. While she finished the album recordings with a second session in March 2008, it was left unused though Benaissa later leaked several songs to her MySpace account. Also in 2008, Benaissa appeared as a guest vocalist on rapper Fler's third studio album Fremd im eigenen Land.

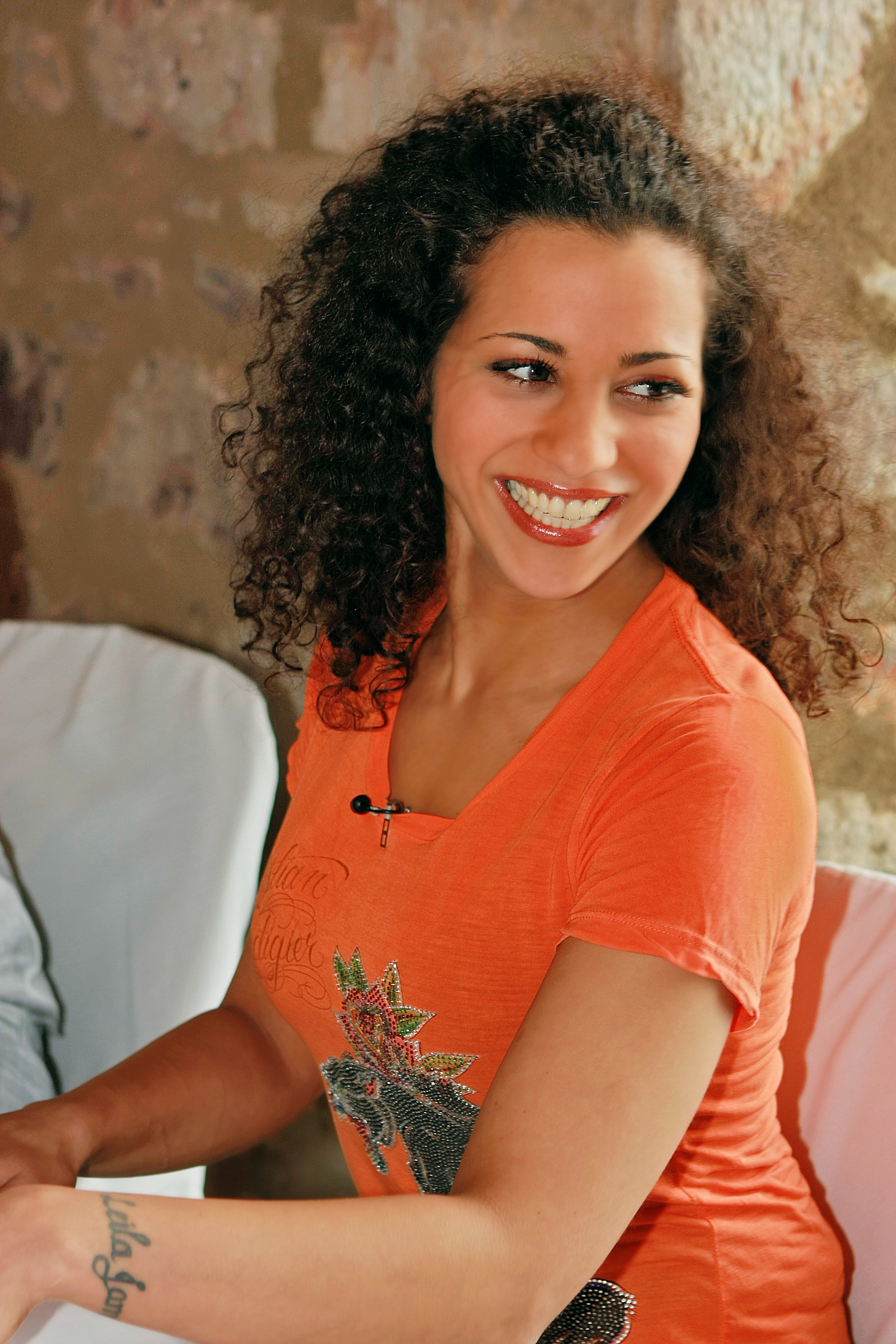
Benaissa in 2008

On 11 April 2009, shortly before the release of the band's fifth studio album Welcome to the Dance, Benaissa was arrested on suspicion of having had unprotected intercourse on several occasions in 2004 and 2006 without beforehand informing her partners that she was HIV-positive, allegedly infecting one partner with HIV. She was remanded into custody, after a judge ruled there was a danger she might repeat the alleged offence, but eventually released on 21 April 2009, subject to unnamed conditions. Although her lawyers tried to ban the media from reporting on Benaissa's previously unknown HIV infection, interviews with the public prosecutor's office led to her being outed and subjected to intense hostility and public humiliation. As a result, No Angels had several advertising contracts canceled and the commercial success of Welcome to the Dance and its singles suffered significantly from the negative press.

In February 2010, she was charged with causing bodily harm, an offence carrying a sentence of six months to ten years imprisonment. On 16 August 2010, she admitted in court to having had unprotected sex without telling her partners she was HIV-positive, but denied deliberately causing any infection. One of her three partners, with whom she had sex between 2000 and 2004, became infected with HIV as a result. In May 2010, No Angels began their five-date acoustic An Intimate Evening With tour in Munich, their first concert tour in eight years. Benaissa did not take part in the tour as she had called in sick a week before, prompting the remaining trio to re-arrange their set at the last minute. On 26 August 2010, she was found guilty on one count of causing grievous bodily harm and two of attempted bodily harm and was given a two-year suspended sentence.

In September 2010, after months of speculation, the singer announced via MySpace that she had quit the band for good, leaving No Angels as a trio. In her statement, Benaissa claimed she felt that she had become bigger than the group, stating: "The scandal, the trial – they were overwhelmed by it [...] They'll be fine without me." In September 2010, she released her biography Alles wird gut, written by Tinka Dippel. Benaissa later expressed her regret about publishing it. After her conviction, Benaissa and her daughter relocated to Berlin. In November 2010, in a show of solidarity, she was invited to perform two Rio Reiser songs at the Reminders Day Award, an awards ceremony for extraordinary commitment in the fight against HIV and AIDS. The same month, Benaissa announced that she was preparing to record an album with covers by Reiser though these plans never materialized. In 2011, she largely withdrew from the public eye to obtain her high school diploma at Berlin-Kolleg and began training as an event manager. Her vocals on rapper Thea Queen of Light's 2012 EP Book of Truth would mark her final credit for the time being.

=== 2018–2025: Return to the limelight ===
After a few years away from the public, in 2018, Benaissa began making occasional appearances as a singer again. In December 2018, she, along with The Real Rogers & Friends gospel band, served as a backing vocalist at singer Mariah Carey's Christmas concert in Berlin. In October 2019, she co-starred in rapper Mellow Mark's music video for his song "Stay Humble." The same month, Benaissa was announced as the new member of the all-female Dresden a cappella band Medlz. The quartet was expected to embark on a concert tour in April 2020, though the series was delayed following the outbreak and subsequent spreading of the COVID-19 virus. Benaissa recorded two studios album with band, including the cover album (Das) läuft bei uns and the Christmas album Weihnachtsleuchten, Vol. 2, both released in 2020.

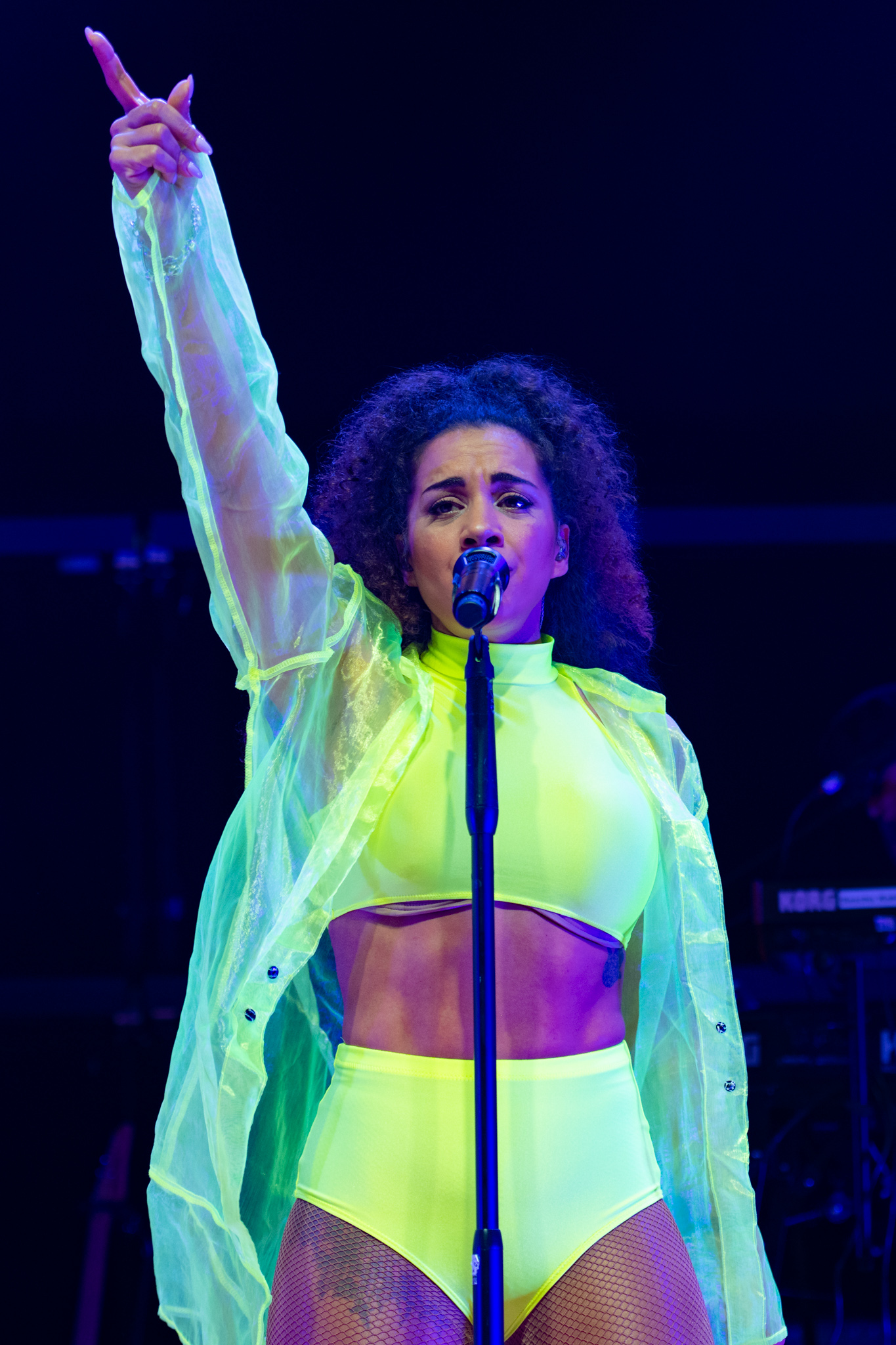
Benaissa in 2022

In late 2020, BMG Rights Management acquired the catalog of No Angels' former label Cheyenne Records. Released to strong streaming numbers in November 2020, a revived interest from the media and their fan base prompted Benaissa and her former band mates to launch an official Instagram account through which they began sharing private photos and hosted several livestreams in the weeks following. With BMG interested in issuing updated versions of their early catalog, the quartet re-formed in January 2021 to record 20, their first full-length album release since 2009, with plans to expand the anniversary celebrations. Released in June 2021, the album debuted at number one on the German Albums Chart, becoming No Angels' first chart topper in nearly two decades. In June 2022, the band kicked off their Celebration Tour at the Kindl-Bühne Wuhlheide.

In November 2023, Benaissa released the single "Ich halt dich nicht auf," a duet with singer Noël André. The song is planned to precede her yet-to-be-titled second solo album which Benaissa was expecting for release in 2024. On 27 March 2024, Benaissa co-starred as Maria in the RTL live action musical Die Passion, based on the Passion of Jesus and filmed in Kassel. While the live show was broadcast to highly critical reviews, Benaissa herself was praised for her performance. From April to May 2024, she competed as Elgonia on the tenth season of the German adaption of the reality singing competition television series The Masked Singer, finishing in fourth place. In 2025, she reteamed with former No Angels collaborator Peter Plate to record the song "Der Krieg ist aus," the lead single from the soundtrack album Romeo & Julia – Liebe ist Alles.

=== 2026–present: Renewed solo activity ===
In February 2026, Benaissa self-released a deluxe edition of Schritt für Schritt to commemorate the album's 20th anniversary, featuring the single versions of "Es ist Liebe" and "Ich hab dich," along with the previously unreleased track "Familie," and new artwork. To promote the release, she performed two standalone concerts in Berlin and Cologne, her first solo live appearances in several years. That same month, she also joined the 19th season of Let's Dance, the German adaption of the dance competition television series Strictly Come Dancing. Partnered with professional dancer Vadim Garbuzov, she ultimately finished seventh out of 14 contestants, despite having been considered a frontrunner after several weeks of standout performances.

In May 2026, she self-released the single "Es könnte nicht besser sein," co-written with Philippe Bühler. This was followed by “Nach vorn” in July 2026. On October 2, 2026, coinciding with her participation as a contestant on the 14th season of the reality show Promi Big Brother, Benaissa announced her second solo album, Orangeblau, which is scheduled for release on September 3, 2027. The album's third single, "Lied gegen die Angst," was released the same day as the announcement.

== Discography ==
=== Studio albums ===
List of albums, with selected chart positions
Title	Details	Peak positions
Title	Details	GER
Schritt für Schritt	Released: 24 February 2006; Label: Universal Music Urban; Formats: CD, download	71

=== Singles ===
List of singles, with selected chart positions
Title	Year	Peak positions		Album
Title	Year	GER	AUT	Album
"Es ist Liebe"	2005	64	—	Schritt für Schritt
"Ich hab dich"	2005	36	60	Schritt für Schritt
"Won't Forget These Days" (with Music Team Germany)	2006	48	—	Non-album singles
"Ich halt dich nicht auf" (with Noel Andre)	2023	—	—	Non-album singles
"Der Krieg ist aus"	2025	—	—	Non-album singles
"Es könnte nicht besser sein"	2006	—	—	Orangeblau
"Nach vorn"	2006	—	—	Orangeblau
"Lied gegen die Angst"	2006	—	—	Orangeblau
"—" denotes a recording that did not chart or was not released in that territory.

=== Appearances ===
List of appearances
Title	Year	Other artist(s)	Album
"Liebe & Verstand"	2001	Sisters Keepers	Lightkultur
"Know Your Emotion"	2005	—N/a	"Ich hab dich"
"Won't Forget These Days"	2006	Music Team Germany project	Charity CD single
"Dirty Dancing"	2007	DJ Sakin	Vinyl single
"Unlock My Chains"	2007	Superlounger	Islands Vol. 04
"Mein Jahr"	2008	Fler	Fremd im eigenen Land
"Schüffelma	2008	Skit Sketch	Kennsduskitsketwarumnich?
"Wir sind keine Kinder mehr"	2009	Samy Deluxe, Xavier Naidoo	Diss wo ich herkomm
