= AK4711 =

German pop rock band

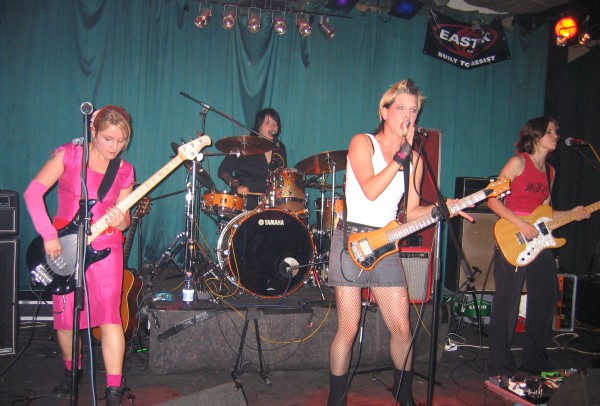
- AK4711 in 2005

Background information
- Genre: Pop rock
- Years active: 2003–2007
- Members: Anja Krabbe; Caroline Bigge; Cindy Hennes; Kerstin Sund

AK4711 were a German pop-rock band, noted for their single Rock.

== History ==
The name is a wordplay on the AK-47 assault rifle, 4711, a brand of Eau de Cologne, and the initials of the lead singer Anja Krabbe. Before the band was formed, Krabbe released two solo albums and worked on film music and soundtracks.

In 2004 the band appeared regularly on German TV, where their participation in the Jägermeister Music Tour. Their 2005 single Rock was chosen as one of the title tracks for FIFA 06.

The band was introduced to a wider audience on 18 January 2006, when they made their first appearance on TV total, a popular German TV programme. They participated in the Bundesvision Song Contest 2006, but came in last place with their song Kein schönerer Land. On 7 March 2007, the band split up for personal reasons. Anja Krabbe still performs as a solo artist and as part of various bands. Cindy Hennes and Kerstin Sund are part of other bands and Carolina Bigge's plans are unknown.

== Discography ==
=== Albums ===
- Erste Hilfe (2006)

=== EPs ===
- Macht Nix + Mehr (2005)

=== Singles ===
- Rock (2005)
- Kein Schönerer Land (2006)
