= Pyranja =

German rapper

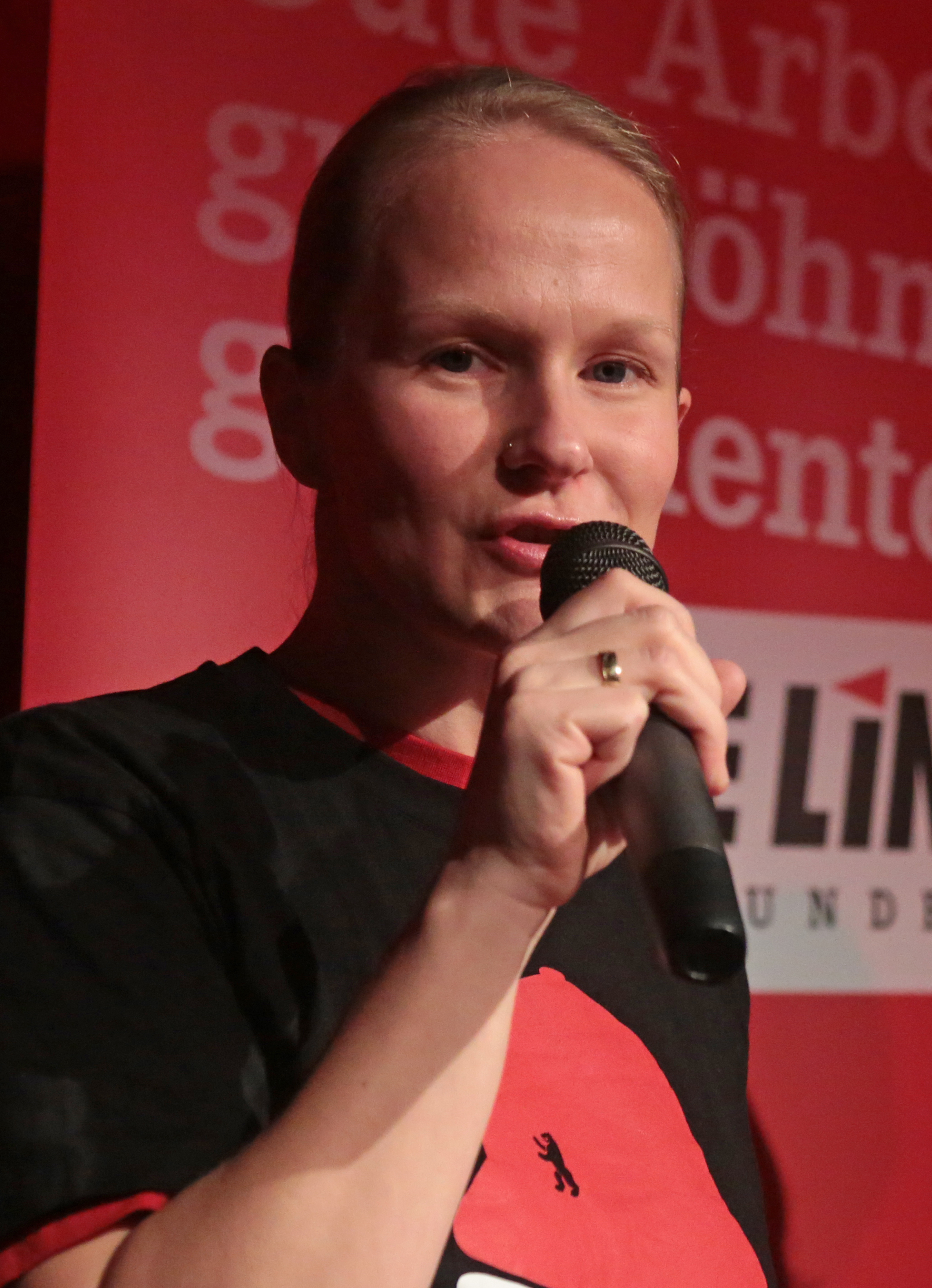
- Pyranja at a political event in 2019

Background information
- Also known as: Christiane Latte
- Born: Anja Käckenmeister; 1978 (age 47–48); Rostock, East Germany
- Genres: German hip hop
- Occupation: Rapper
- Years active: 1994–present
- Labels: Def Jam Germany, Dackel Enterprise, Pyranja Records
- Website: pyranja.de

Anja Käckenmeister (born 1978), known professionally as Pyranja, is a German rapper.

== Biography ==
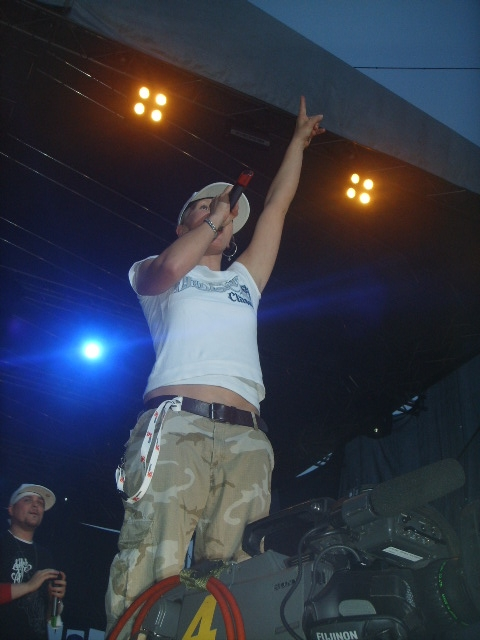
Pyranja performing

Pyranja started rapping at the age of 16. Early supporters and precursors were the rap crews DSC and the Underdog Cru. After a yearlong stay in Boston, Pyranja went back to Berlin, Germany where she entered the music scene and made connections quickly.

In 2001, the label Def Jam Germany released her first EP, called "Im Kreis" which entered the German charts with little to any promotion. Following the production of Pyranja's album, Wurzeln & Flügel Def Jam Germany broke up.

Later, Wurzeln & Flügel was released by another label, Dackel Enterprise. The sales figures of this record also surpassed expectations and steadied her reputation.

In 2004, Pyranja along with her long-term friends and studio mates, Joe Rilla, Dra-Q, Jamie White and Sera Finale founded the rap crew Ostblokk. The group released The CD Einmal um Blokk.

In 2004, Pyranja also released her CD Frauen & Technik by her self-created independent label Pyranja Records. This record's complexity marks a growth in her career while still maintaining the sound she's known for. Also on this album, Pyranja introduced a new pseudonym Christiane Latte for her tracks Ab 18 and Blondes Gift as a dig at the male-dominated rap market.

In 2006, Pyranja introduced the new single "Nie wieder" and the album Laut & Leise. Also in 2006, she performed for her home state, Mecklenburg-Vorpommern and the Bundesvision Song Contest, winning eighth place.

== Discography ==
=== Albums ===
- 2003: Wurzeln & Flügel ("Wings & Roots", Dackel Enterprise)
- 2004: Frauen & Technik ("Women & Technology", Pyranja Records)
- 2004: Einmal Um Blokk, ("Once around the block" with Ostblokk, Ostblokk Plattenbau)
- 2006: Laut & Leise ("Loud & Quiet", Headrush)

=== Singles and EPs ===
- 2002: "Swingerclub" (Phlatline Records)
- 2002: "Fremdkörper / Kennzeichen D Pt.2" ("Foreign object / License Plate D Pt 2", Def Jam Promo)
- 2000: "Im Kreis / Nachtflug" ("In a circle / Night flight", Def Jam Promo)
- 2001: "Im Kreis EP" (Def Jam Germany)
- 2002: "Reine Nervensache" ("All about strength of nerves", Def Jam Promo)
- 2003: "Egal Was Ihr Sagt" ("No matter what you say", Dackel Enterprise)
- 2004: "Zeilen Für Dich" ("Lines for you", Pyranja Records)
- 2005: "Samba" (with Ostbokk, Ostblokk Plattenbau)
- 2005: "Pyranja vs. Laudert & Fröhlich" (Pyranja Records)
- 2006: "Nie Wieder" ("Never again", Pyranja Records)

=== Other ===
- 1998: Feature on the Underdog Cru album Maximum
- 1998: Track the EP "Großmogul Nordost"
- 1998: Demotape
- 1999: Track with Daniel Santiago for the Compilation Beastside
- 1999: Feature on the Joe Rilla tape album Tritt 2000 Ärsche ("Kick 2000 asses")
- 1999: Track with Daniel Santiago on the compilation Sallys Sounds
- 2000: Track on the soundtrack to Ants in the Pants
- 2000: Track on the DJ Derezon tape album BerlinXklusiv
- 2000: Track on the Deja Vue album Zwei Dumme ein Gedanke ("Two idiots one idea")
- 2001: Several tracks on compilations, among others: Rappublik Sampler, Berlin macht Schule, Juice Master Blaster, Ladys First, Splash Allstar Event Album, Def Jam Unstoppable
- 2001: "Nachtflug RMX" on the Roey Marquis album Momentaufnahmen ("Snapshots")
- 2001: "Special Broadcast" with Fiva Mc on the "Beatz aus der Bude Allstars" compilation
- 2002: Feature on the Roey Marquis tape Battle Of The Words
- 2002: Feature on Moqui Marbles' album
- 2002: Feature on album "Kopfhoehrer" by Fiva MC & DJ Radrum, Track "Kopf Hoch"
- 2002: Feature on Roey Marquis' album "Herzessenz" ("Essence of the heart")
- 2003: Several tracks on compilations, among others: Untergrund Experiment, Starting Line-Up XXL Dope Beats, Ghetto Fabulous
- 2003: Several features on the soundtrack to the hip hop themed feature film "Status Yo"
- 2004: Feature on Kimoe's EP "Ein neuer Morgen" ("A new morning")
- 2004: Feature on Jago's LP
- 2004: Feature on Yaneq & Freaky Floe's EP "Nachts Draußen" ("Outside at night")
- 2004: Feature on Moqui Marbles' LP
- 2005: Feature on "Back in the Tapez" by DraQ & Jamie White
- 2006: "Guess who's back", track on "Juice Exclusive" sampler #61
