= Puppenspiel =

Studio album by Unheilig
- Released: 22 February 2008
- Genre: Neue Deutsche Härte
- Length: 66:17 (Standard Edition); 75:50 (Limited Edition)
- Language: German
- Label: Four Rock Entertainment
- Producer: Der Graf

Unheilig chronology
Moderne Zeiten (2006)	Puppenspiel (2008)	Grosse Freiheit (2010)

Puppenspiel (German for "Doll Play") is the sixth studio album released by the Neue Deutsche Härte band Unheilig. It was released on 22 February 2008 and, like Zelluloid and Moderne Zeiten before it, was released in two versions, a standard 14-track edition and a limited 16-track edition.

== Track listing ==
No.	Title	English translation	Length
1.	"Vorhang Auf"	"Curtain Up"	2:03
2.	"Puppenspieler"	"Puppeteer"	4:04
3.	"Spiegelbild"	"Reflection"	5:37
4.	"Dein Clown"	"Your Clown"	4:52
5.	"Sei Mein Licht"	"Be My Light"	5:13
6.	"Fang Mich Auf"	"Catch Me"	4:48
7.	"Feuerengel"	"Fire Angel"	5:32
8.	"Kleine Puppe"	"Small Puppet"	5:12
9.	"An Deiner Seite"	"By Your Side"	6:07
10.	"Die Bestie"	"The Beast"	5:07
11.	"Lampenfieber"	"Stage Fright"	5:01
12.	"Wie Viele Jahre"	"How Many Years"	4:34
13.	"Glaub An Mich" (Limited edition release only)	"Believe In Me"	4:23
14.	"Spielzeugmann" (Limited edition release only)	"Toy Man"	5:10
15.	"Der Vorhang Fällt"	"The Curtain Falls"	4:58
16.	"Memoria"	"Memory"	3:09

== Charts ==
- European Top 100 Albums – #56
- Media Control Charts – #13
