= Gipfelstürmer =

2014 studio album by Unheilig

Studio album by Unheilig
- Released: 12 December 2014
- Genre: Pop; alternative rock; gothic rock; Neue Deutsche Härte
- Length: 1:04:59; 1:42:36 (Limited Deluxe Edition)
- Language: German
- Label: Vertigo Records
- Producer: Der Graf, Henning Verlage

Unheilig chronology
Lichter der Stadt (2012)	Gipfelstürmer (2014)	Von Mensch zu Mensch (2016)

Singles from Gipfelstürmer
- 1. "Zeit zu gehen" Released: 31 October 2014; 2. "Mein Berg" Released: 13 March 2015; 3. "Glück auf das Leben" Released: 19 June 2015

Gipfelstürmer (German for Summit Conquerors) is the ninth album by the Neue Deutsche Härte band Unheilig, which was released on 12 December 2014.

== Track listing ==
No.	Title	English Translation	Length
1.	"Der Berg (Intro)"	The Mountain (Intro)	4:48
2.	"Hinunter bis auf Eins"	Down to One	3:22
3.	"Zeit zu gehen"	Time to Go	4:10
4.	"Die Weisheiten des Lebens"	The Wisdoms of Life	3:26
5.	"Zwischen Licht und Schatten"	Between Light and Shadow	4:28
6.	"Glück auf das Leben"	Here's to Life	3:08
7.	"Wie in guten alten Zeiten"	Like in Good Old Times	3:54
8.	"Alles hat seine Zeit"	Everything Has Its Time	3:50
9.	"Echo"	Echo	3:46
10.	"Mein Berg"	My Mountain	4:21
11.	"Goldrausch"	Gold Rush	3:43
12.	"Held für einen Tag"	Hero for a Day	4:04
13.	"Dem Himmel so nah"	So Close to the Sky	3:40
14.	"Wir sind die Gipfelstürmer"	We are the Summit Conquerors	3:47
15.	"Hand in Hand"	Hand in Hand	4:00
16.	"Der Gipfel (Outro)"	The Summit (Outro)	6:03

=== Limited Deluxe Edition Track Listing ===
No.	Title	Length
1.	"Zeit zu gehen (Demoversion)"	4:00
2.	"Zwischen Licht und Schatten (Demoversion)"	3:55
3.	"Held für einen Tag (Demoversion)"	4:47
4.	"Echo (Demoversion)"	3:39
5.	"Hand in Hand (Demoversion)"	3:15
6.	"Dem Himmel so nah (Demoversion)"	3:35
7.	"Die Weisheiten des Lebens (Demoversion)"	3:27
8.	"Alles hat seine Zeit (Demoversion)"	3:50
9.	"Hinunter bis auf Eins (Demoversion)"	3:38
10.	"Mein Berg (Demoversion)"	4:24

== Charts ==
=== Weekly charts ===
Chart (2014–2015)	Peak position
Austrian Albums (Ö3 Austria)	3
German Albums (Offizielle Top 100)	1
Swiss Albums (Schweizer Hitparade)	2

=== Weekly charts ===
Chart (2014)	Position
German Albums (Offizielle Top 100)	10

Chart (2015)	Position
Austrian Albums (Ö3 Austria)	30
German Albums (Offizielle Top 100)	13
Swiss Albums (Schweizer Hitparade)	9

== Certifications and sales ==
Region	Certification	Certified units/sales
Austria (IFPI Austria)	Platinum	15,000^{*}
Germany (BVMI)	5× Gold	500,000^{‡}
^{*} Sales figures based on certification alone.^{‡} Sales+streaming figures based on certification alone.
