= Schutzengel =

Schutzengel may refer to:

- Schutzengel (film), a 2012 film
- Schutzengel (EP), an EP by Unheilig
