= Große Freiheit (album) =

Studio album by Unheilig
- Released: 19 February 2010
- Recorded: 2009
- Genres: Neue Deutsche Härte; pop rock; alternative rock; gothic rock; synthpop
- Length: 1:06:19
- Languages: German and English
- Label: Vertigo (Universal)
- Producer: Der Graf

Unheilig chronology
Puppenspiel (2008)	Große Freiheit (2010)	Lichter der Stadt (2012)

Limited Fanbox Edition
- The Limited Fanbox Edition is strictly limited to 5,000 copies.

Singles from Grosse Freiheit
- 1. "Geboren um zu leben" Released: 29 January 2010; 2. "Für immer" Released: 21 May 2010; 3. "Unter deiner Flagge" Released: 24 September 2010

Grosse Freiheit - Winter edition

Singles from Grosse Freiheit - Winter edition
- 1. "Winter" Released: November 19, 2010

Große Freiheit (German for 'Great Freedom') is the seventh album by the Neue Deutsche Härte band Unheilig. It was released on 19 February 2010 as a standard 14-track album and a Fanbox Edition boxset which was limited to 5,000 copies that contains the following:

- a limited edition 16-track studio album (including 2 bonus tracks) in digipak.
- a bonus CD of unreleased studio recordings of Unheilig from the current studio sessions and recordings and songs from the first musical steps of Der Graf so far (never published).
- an Unheilig flag.
- Autobiography of Der Graf, 176-sided: Der Graf tells of his first musical steps up to his latest album Große Freiheit.

The album's title refers to a street in Hamburg-St. Pauli, the Große Freiheit, a side-street of the Reeperbahn.

== Track listing ==
No.	Title	English translation	Length
1.	"Das Meer"	The Sea	3:39
2.	"Seenot"	Distress	4:22
3.	"Für Immer"	Forever	3:22
4.	"Geboren um zu Leben"	Born to Live	3:50
5.	"Abwärts"	Downwards	3:30
6.	"Halt mich"	Hold Me	3:47
7.	"Unter Feuer"	Under Fire	5:03
8.	"Große Freiheit"	Great Freedom	3:48
9.	"Ich gehöre mir"	I Belong to Me	3:34
10.	"Heimatstern"	Home Star	4:10
11.	"Sternbild"	Constellation	4:28
12.	"Unter Deiner Flagge"	Under Your Banner	4:10
13.	"Fernweh"	Wanderlust	4:51
14.	"Schenk mir ein Wunder (Bonus track)"	Send me a Miracle	4:36
15.	"Auf Kurs (Bonus track)"	On Course	4:38
16.	"Neuland"	Newland	4:31

=== Bonus disc ===
Frühe Werke Und Rohe Entwürfe translates as "Early Works and Rough Drafts"

1. Human Nations (First Musical Steps in 1992)
2. The Beast (First Musical Steps in 1992)
3. Lost Heaven (Unpublished song from the early Unheiligzeit)
4. Faded Times (Unpublished song from the early Unheiligzeit)
5. Seenot (Demo)
6. Für Immer (Demo)
7. Unter deiner Flagge (Demo)
8. Geboren um zu leben (Demo)
9. Geboren um zu leben (Demo 2)

== Live album ==
On 11 June 2010 a live album was released with the same name, which contains a boxset with a CD and the DVD featuring the show. A Limited Deluxe Edition contains four discs while the Special Edition contains two discs.

== Chart performance ==
In Germany, it remained at No. 1 for 23 non-consecutive weeks, to date the longest stay of any album in the 21st century and the first album by a German artist to do so.

Große Freiheit is the second most downloaded album of all time in Germany behind Adele's 21, with digital sales between 100,000 and 140,000.

Spending 52 weeks in the German top ten, the album is the 17th album to spend a year or longer there and the first to do so since Ich + Ich's Vom selben Stern, which was released in July 2007. Große Freiheit left the top 5 of the German Albums Chart for the first time the week it achieved this feat.

=== Chart positions ===
Chart (2010)	Peak position
Austria (Ö3 Austria Top 40)	1
Germany (Media Control Charts)	1
Switzerland (Schweizer Hitparade)	3
European Top 100	5

=== Year-end charts ===
Year	Chart	Rank
2010	European Top 100 Albums	9
2010	German Albums Chart	1
2011	Austrian Albums Chart	7
2011	German Albums Chart	5
2011	Swiss Albums Chart	16

=== Decade-end charts ===
Chart (2010–2019)	Position
German Albums (Offizielle Top 100)	2

== Certifications and sales ==
Region	Certification	Certified units/sales
Austria (IFPI Austria)	4× Platinum	80,000^{*}
Germany (BVMI)	9× Platinum	1,800,000^{‡}
Switzerland (IFPI Switzerland)	2× Platinum	60,000^{^}
^{*} Sales figures based on certification alone.^{^} Shipments figures based on certification alone.^{‡} Sales+streaming figures based on certification alone.

== Große Freiheit (Winter Edition) ==
This album was re-released on 19 November 2010, with all of the standard 14 tracks from Große Freiheit, excluding the two bonus songs. A second disc contains "Winterland" and its remixes. There is a new cover to reflect the title.

=== Track listing ===
No.	Title	English Translation	Length
1.	"Winterland"
2.	"Geboren um zu leben (Piano Version)"	Born to Live (Piano Version)
3.	"Unter deiner Flagge (Piano Version)"	Under your Flag (Piano Version)
4.	"Winterland (Single Version)"
5.	"Winterland (Gregorian Version)"
6.	"Der Graf liest Dornröschen"	The Count reads Sleeping Beauty

== Grosse Freiheit Tour 2010-2011 ==
=== 2010 ===
- March 5 - Berlin, Germany - The Dome 53 at Velodrom
- March 19 - Bochum, Germany - RuhrCongress Halle
- March 20 - Erfurt, Germany - Stadthalle
- March 27 - Giessen, Germany - Hessenhalle
- April 1 - Munchen, Germany - Zenith
- April 3 - Berlin, Germany - Columbia Halle
- April 4 - Dresdon, Germany - Alter Schlachthof
- April 5 - Dresdon, Germany - Alter Schlachthof
- April 9 - Magdeburg, Germany - Factory
- April 10 - Hamburg, Germany - Docks Club
- April 11 - Hamburg, Germany - Docks Club
- April 12 - Hamburg, Germany - Docks Club
- April 16 - Leipzig, Germany - Agra Halle
- April 17 - Cologne, Germany - Palladium
- April 30 - Pratteln, Switzerland - Z7
- May 1 - Pratteln, Switzerland - Z7
- May 2 - Bosen, Germany - Hexentanz Festival
- May 6 - Bielefeld, Germany - Ringlokschuppen
- May 7 - Bielefeld, Germany - Ringlokschuppen
- May 8 - Wurzburg, Germany - Posthalle
- May 9 - Berlin, Germany - Columbia Halle
- May 12 - Vienna, Austrua - Gasometer
- May 14 - Cologne, Germany - Palladium
- May 15 - Oberhausen, Germany - Turbinenhalle
- May 20 - Stuttgart, Germany - The Dome 54 at Hanns-Martin-Schleyer-Halle
- May 21 - Stuttgart, Germany - Liederhalle
- May 22 - Stuttgart, Germany - Liederhalle
- May 29 - Hamburg, Germany - Grand Prix Party at Spielburdenplatz
- June 11 - Interlaken, Switzerland - Greenfield Festival
- June 12 - Gelsenkirchen, Germany - Blackfield festival
- July 10 - Göttingen, Germany - MTV Campus Invasion 2010
- July 16 - Waregum, Belgium - Gothic Festival
- July 30 - Grafenheinichen, Germany - Jump Community Party at Ferropolis
- July 31 - Hanau Am Main, Germany - Amphitheater
- August 1 - Hanau Am Main, Germany - Amphitheater
- August 7 - Hildesheim, Germany - Mera Luna Festival
- August 15 - Schwetzingen, Germany - Grosse Freiheit Open Air
- August 20 - Stormthal, Germany - Highfield Festival
- August 21 - Schwerin, Germany - Freilichtbuhne
- August 27 - Hamburg - Germany - HTA Hambuger Trab-Arena
- August 28 - Potsdam, Germany - Metropolis Halle
- September 2 - Wiesen, Austria - Two Days A Week Festival
- September 17 - Hemer, Germany - Landesgartenschaugelande
- September 18 - Bern, Switzerland - Bierhubeli
- September 19 - Zurich, Switzerland - One By One Festival
- October 1 - Berlin, Germany - Bundesvision at Hanns-Martin-Schleyer-Halle
- October 22 - Hohenems, Austria - Tennis Events Center
- October 23 - Linz, Austria - Posthof
- October 24 - Graz, Austria - Helmut-List-Halle
- November 12 - Siegen, Germany - Siegerlandhalle
- November 13 - Siegen, Germany - Siegerlandhalle
- November 18 - Frankfurt, Germany - Jahrhunderthalle
- November 19 - Frankfurt. Germany - Jahrhunderthalle
- November 20 - Regensburg, Germany - Donau Arena
- November 25 - Vienna, Austria - Gasometer
- November 26 - Furth, Germany - Stadthalle (Furth)
- November 27 - Munster, Germany - Halle Munsterland
- December 2 - Bochum, Germany - 1 Live Krone 2010
- December 4 - Bremen, Germany - Bremen-Arena
- December 5 - Kiel, Germany - Sparkassen-Arena
- December 10 - Braunschweig, Germany - Volkswagen Halle
- December 11 - Chemnitz, Germany - Messe
- December 14 - Mannheim, Germany - Maimarktclub
- December 15 - Kassel, Germany - Kongress Palais-Blauersaal
- December 17 - Ulm, Germany - Donauhalle
- December 18 - Trier, Germany - Trier Arena
- December 25 - Berlin, Germany - Berlin Arena
- December 26 - Berlin, Germany - Berlin Arena
- December 28 - Kempton, Germany - BigBox
- December 29 - Freiburg, Germany - Rothaus Arena
- December 30 - Düsseldorf, Germany - Phillips Halle

=== 2011 ===
- January 2 - Lingen, Germany - Emslandhallen
- January 7 - Magdeburg, Germany - Stadthalle
- January 8 - Bamburg, Germany - Stechert Arena
- January 9 - Salzburg, Austria - Salzburg Arena
- January 14 - Dortmund, Germany - Westfalenhallen
- January 15 - Karlsruhe, Germany - Europahalle
- January 20 - Augsburg, Germany - Schwabenhalle
- January 21 - Hannover, Germany - AWD Hall
- January 22 - Erfurt, Germany - Thuringenhalle
- January 28 - Rostock, Germany - Stadthalle
- January 29 - Cottbus, Germany - Messehalle
- February 4 - Cologne, Germany - Lanxess Arena
- February 5 - Magdeburg, Germany - Stadthalle
- March 24 - Berlin, Germany - Echo 2011
- May 27 - Hannover, Germany - Expoplaza
- June 4 - Gelsenkirchen, Germany - Amphitheater
- June 5 - Gelsenkirchen, Germany - Amphitheater
- June 17 - Bonn, Germany - Kunst-und Ausstellungshalle
- June 18 - Fulda, Germany - Messe-Galerie
- June 25 - Frankfurt, Germany - Stadion Im Sportpark
- July 1 - Basel, Switzerland - St.Jacobshalle
- July 2 - Clam, Austria - Burgclam
- July 3 - Clam, Austria - Burgclam
- July 7 - Dresden, Germany - Elbufer
- July 8 - Dresden, Germany - Elbufer
- July 9 - Dresden, Germany - Elbufer
- July 10 - Heilbrenn, Germany - Wertwiessen Park
- July 15 - Bielfeld, Germany - Ravensburger Park
- July 16 - Ulm, Germany - KlosterWiblingen
- July 17 - Baden-Baden, Germany - Rennplatz
- July 22 - Emmendingen, Germany - Schlossplatz
- July 23 - Munchen, Germany - OlympiaPark
- July 24 - Schwabisch Gmind, Germany - Schiesstal Platz
- July 30 - Erfurt, Germany - Streigerwald Stadion
- August 6 - Berlin, Germany - Kindl-Buhne Wuhlheide
- August 7 - Berlin, Germany - Kindl-Buhne Wuhlheide
- August 20 - Braunschweig, Germany - Volksbank Brawobuhne
- August 21 - Coburg, Germany - Schlossplatz
- August 26 - Losheim, Germany - Stranbad
- August 27 - Bremen, Germany - Pier 2
- August 28 - Hamburg, Germany - Trabenbahn
- September 1 - Rostock, Germany - IGA Park
- September 2 - Monchengladbach, Germany - Warsteiner Hockey Park
- September 3 - Gronau, Germany - Burgerhalle
Grosse Freiheit Tour Setlist
1. Das Meer
2. Seenot
3. Schenk Mir Ein Wunder
4. Unter Deiner Flagge
5. Feuerengel
6. Abwarts
7. Halt Mich
8. An Deiner Seite
9. Freiheit
10. Astronaut
11. Grosse Freiheit
12. Kleine Puppe
13. Unter Feuer
14. Maschine
15. Fur Immer
16. Lampenfieber
17. Geboren Um Zu Leban
18. Ich Gehore Mir
19. Mein Stern

== See also ==
- List of best-selling albums in Germany
