= Festival of Darkness =

Festival of Darkness or Celebration of Darkness may refer to:

- Samhain
- Halloween
- Wave-Gotik-Treffen
