= Winter (Unheilig song) =

Single by Unheilig

from the album Große Freiheit (Winter Edition)
- Released: 19 November 2010
- Genre: Pop rock
- Label: Vertigo Be (Universal)
- Songwriter(s): Der Graf
- Producer(s): Der Graf

Unheilig singles chronology
"Unter deiner Flagge" (2010)	"Winter" (2010)	"So wie du warst" (2012)

Music video
- "Winter" on YouTube

"Winter" is a 2010 single from Unheilig. There are two versions, a standard two-track single and a limited edition disc with a poster included. It is the ninth single to be released from Unheilig.

== Video ==
The video for Winter made its premier on Unheilig's official site on 5 November 2010.

== Track listing ==
No.	Title	Length
1.	"Winter (single version)"
2.	"Winter (piano version)"

== Charts ==
Chart (2010)	Peak position
Austria Single Charts	6
German Singles Chart	4
Swiss Music Charts	64

=== Year-end charts ===
Chart (2010)	Position
Germany (Media Control AG)	42
Chart (2011)	Position
Germany (Media Control AG)	100

=== Certifications ===
Country	Certifications (sales thresholds)
Germany	Gold
