= Schutzengel (EP) =

EP by Unheilig
- Released: 21 July 2003
- Genre: Neue Deutsche Härte
- Length: 32:04
- Languages: German and English
- Label: Four Rock Entertainment
- Producer: Der Graf

Unheilig chronology
Tannenbaum (2002)	Schutzengel (2003)	Freiheit (2004)

Schutzengel (German for "Guardian Angel") is the second studio EP released by the Neue Deutsche Härte band Unheilig. It was released on 21 July 2003.

== Track listing ==
No.	Title	English Translation	Length
1.	"Schutzengel"	Guardian Angel	4:25
2.	"Schutzengel [Orchester Version]"		5:13
3.	"Zinnsoldat"	Toy Soldier	4:40
4.	"Damien"		6:20
5.	"Vollmond [Radio Edit]"	Full Moon	3:55
6.	"Bruder"	Brother	3:37
7.	"One of the Dead (Transpunk Cover)"		3:37
