= Moderne Zeiten =

Studio album by Unheilig
- Released: 20 January 2006
- Genre: Neue Deutsche Härte
- Length: 61:22 (Standard Edition); 69:51 (Limited Edition)
- Language: German
- Label: Four Rock Entertainment
- Producer: Der Graf

Unheilig chronology
Zelluloid (2004)	Moderne Zeiten (2006)	Puppenspiel (2008)

Professional ratings
Review scores
Source	Rating
Gothtronic	4/5 stars

Moderne Zeiten (German for "Modern Times") is the fifth studio album released by the Neue Deutsche Härte band Unheilig. It was released on 20 January 2006 and, like the band's previous album, Zelluloid, it was released in two versions: a standard 14-track edition, and a limited 16-track edition. The standard edition is in a regular jewel case, with a pinkish-brown album color, while the limited edition is a digipak, with a white album cover.

In July 2009, Moderne Zeiten was re-released with new artwork and a remastered audio track but the cover stayed the same.

== Track listing ==
No.	Title	English translation	Length
1.	"Das Uhrwerk"	"The Clockwork"	1:11
2.	"Luftschiff"	"Airship"	6:05
3.	"Ich Will Alles"	"I Want It All"	3:49
4.	"Goldene Zeiten"	"Golden Times"	4:18
5.	"Helden"	"Heroes"	4:22
6.	"Astronaut"	"Astronaut"	4:18
7.	"Phönix"	"Phoenix"	3:37
8.	"Lass Uns Liebe Machen"	"Let's Make Love"	4:14
9.	"Horizont"	"Horizon"	5:16
10.	"Sonnenaufgang"	"Sunrise"	4:14
11.	"Gelobtes Land"	"Promised Land"	4:44
12.	"Menschenherz"	"Human Heart"	4:52
13.	"Sonnentag" (Limited edition release only)	"Sunny Day"	3:03
14.	"Tag Für Sieger" (Limited edition release only)	"Day For Victors"	5:25
15.	"Mein Stern"	"My Star"	5:26
16.	"Moderne Zeiten"	"Modern Times"	4:49
