= Von Mensch zu Mensch =

Studio album by Unheilig
- Released: 4 November 2016
- Genre: Alternative rock; pop rock; Neue Deutsche Härte
- Length: 1:09:42
- Language: German
- Label: Vertigo Records

Unheilig chronology
Gipfelstürmer (2014)	Von Mensch zu Mensch (2016)	Weihnachtslichter (2023)

Singles from Von Mensch zu Mensch
- 1. "Von Mensch zu Mensch" Released: 29 July 2016; 2. "Ich würd' dich gern besuchen" Released: 9 September 2016; 3. "Mein Leben ist die Freiheit" Released: 7 October 2016

Von Mensch zu Mensch (German for From Human to Human) is the tenth and final studio album by the German band Unheilig, which was released on 4 November 2016

== Track listing ==
No.	Title	English Translation	Length
1.	"Auf ein letzes Mal (Intro)"	On One Last Time (Intro)	4:28
2.	"Egoist"	Egoist	4:07
3.	"Von Mensch zu Mensch"	From Person to Person	4:17
4.	"Einer von Millionen"	One of a Million	3:14
5.	"Mein Leben ist die Freiheit"	My Life is Freedom	4:37
6.	"Funkenschlag"	Strike of the Spark	4:31
7.	"Ich würd' dich gern besuchen"	I Would Like to Visit You	3:31
8.	"Ein wahres Glück"	A True Happiness	4:49
9.	"Legenden"	Legends	4:08
10.	"Heimatlos"	Homeless	3:58
11.	"Der Sturm"	The Storm	4:09
12.	"Tausend Rosen"	A Thousand Roses	3:23
13.	"Walfänger"	Whaler	6:19
14.	"Krieger"	Warriors	3:31
15.	"Ein letztes Lied"	One Last Song	4:28
16.	"Für alle Zeit (Outro)"	For All Time (Outro)	6:12
Total length:			1:09:42

=== Limited Deluxe DVD Track Listing ===
No.	Title	Length
1.	"Ein letztes Mal von Mensch zu Mensch"
2.	"Hinunter bis auf Eins (Live vom Abschlusskonzert in Köln)"
3.	"Ein letztes Mal - Die Impressionen"
4.	"Zeit zu gehen (Live aus Hamburg)"
5.	"Echo (Live aus Hamburg)"
6.	"Unter deiner Flagge (Live aus Frankfurt A.M.)"
7.	"Für immer (Live aus Frankfurt A.M.)"
8.	"Ein letztes Mal - Ich würd' dich gern besuchen"
9.	"Wie in guten alten Zeiten (Live aus Berlin)"
10.	"Maschine (LIve aus Berlin)"
11.	"An deiner Seite (Live von Abschlusskonzert in Köln)"
12.	"Geboren um zu leben (Live von Abschlusskonzert in Köln)"
13.	"Ein letztes Mal und Für alle Zeit"

== Ein Letztes Mal Tournee 2016 ==
- 13 May - Bad Segeberg, Germany - Freilichttheater am Kalkberg
- 3 June - Hannover, Germany - Gilde Parkbühne
- 4 June - Zwickau, Germany - Flugplatz Zwickau
- 19 June - Munich, Germany - Königplatz
- 25 June - Baunatal, Germany - Parkstadion
- 30 June - Straubing, Germany - Bluetone Festival
- 1 July - Graz, Austria - Freiluftarena B (Messe)
- 2 July - Vienna, Austria - Krieau Open Air
- 15 July - Rostock, Germany - IGA Park
- 16 July - Berlin, Germany - Kindl Bühne Wuhlheide
- 22 July - Emmendingen, Germany - IEM Music Festival
- 23 July - Erfurt, Germany - Freigelände Messehalle Erfurt
- 24 July - Aspach, Germany - Mechatronik Arena
- 29 July - Norderney, Germany - Summertime at Norderney
- 30 July - Saarbrücken, Germany - Messe
- 31 July - Weinheim, Germany - Schlosspark
- 5 August - Rothenburg ob der Tauber, Germany - Eisweise
- 6 August - Dresden - Filmnächte am Elbufer
- 12 August - Mönchengladbach, Germany - SparkassenPark Mönchengladbach
- 13 August - Coburg, Germany - HUK Coburg Open Air Sommer
- 20 August - Ulm, Germany - Kloster Wiblingen
- August - Magdeburg, Germany - Domplatz
- 2 September - Bremerhaven - Open Air Wilhelm-Kaisen-Platz
- 3 September - Ochtrup, Germany - Sportplatz Alte Maate
- 10 September - Köln, Germany - RheinEnergieStadion

== Certifications and sales ==
Region	Certification	Certified units/sales
Germany (BVMI)	Platinum	200,000^{‡}
^{‡} Sales+streaming figures based on certification alone.

== Charts ==
Chart (2017)	Peak position
German Albums (Offizielle Top 100)	1
Austrian Albums (Ö3 Austria)	4
Swiss Albums (Schweizer Hitparade)	3
