= Unheilig =

German pop/rock band

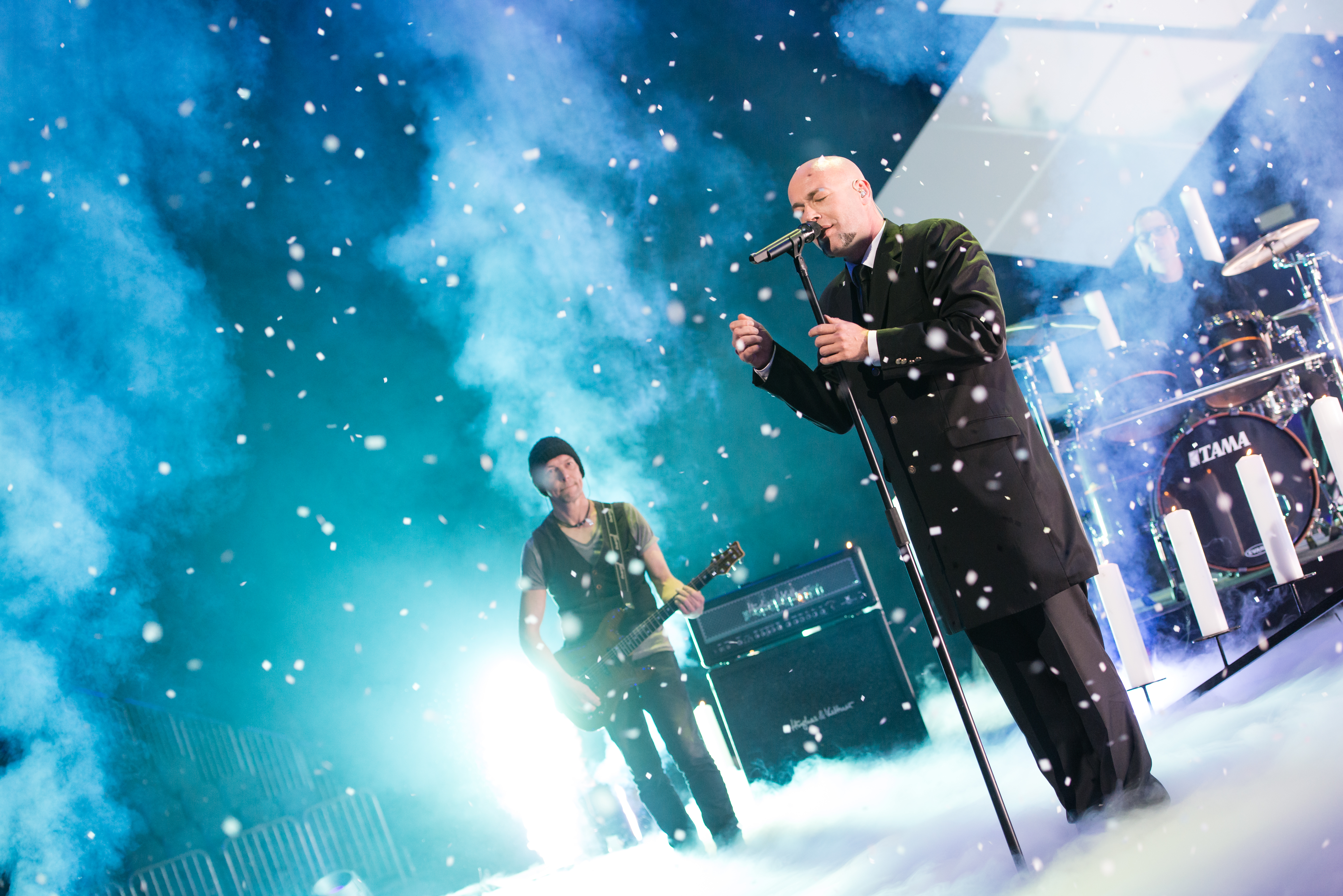
- Unheilig performing in 2014

Background information
- Origin: Aachen, Germany
- Genres: Pop rock; electronic; gothic rock; Neue Deutsche Härte
- Years active: 1999–present
- Labels: Universal; Four Rock; Bloodline; Nilaihah (North America)
- Members: Bernd Heinrich Graf; Henning Verlage; Christoph Termühlen; Martin Potthoff
- Past members: José Alvarez-Brill; Grant Stevens
- Website: unheilig.com

Unheilig [ˈʊnhaɪ̯lɪç] is a German band that combines a number of musical styles, including pop and electronic as well as hard rock. It was founded in Aachen in 1999 and principally consists of vocalist Bernd "Der Graf" Heinrich, along with various musicians. The group's debut album, Phosphor, came out in 2000.

== History ==
=== Early years (1999–2009) ===
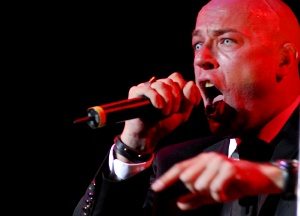
Bernd "Der Graf" Heinrich

Bernd "Der Graf" Heinrich founded Unheilig in 1999 in Aachen, with the Australian musician Grant Stevens and José Alvarez-Brill. Their first single, "Sage Ja!" was released that year, and the band's debut album, Phosphor, came out in 2001. This was followed by the Christmas album Frohes Fest in 2002, Das 2. Gebot in 2003, and the EP Schutzengel, also in 2003. Another full-length album, Zelluloid, came out in 2004.

The band released their first live album, Gastspiel, in 2005, and followed it with the DVD Kopfkino. Moderne Zeiten came out in 2006 and Puppenspiel in 2008. Their second DVD, Vorhang auf, came out the same year.

=== Große Freiheit and Lichter der Stadt (2009–2013) ===
In January 2010, Unheilig released the single "Geboren um zu leben" was released, preceding the album Große Freiheit, which came out the following month and saw the band touring in support. A second single, "Für immer", came out in May and was followed by "Unter deiner Flagge" in September 2010.

In October, the band performed the song "Unter deiner Flagge" at the Bundesvision Song Contest, going on to win that year. In November, they issued the fourth single from Große Freiheit, "Winterland".

In March 2011, Unheilig was nominated for five ECHO Awards (Best National Video for "Geboren um zu leben", ECHO Radio, Most Successful Production Team, Best National Rock/Alternative Group, and Album of the Year for Große Freiheit), eventually winning three.

In February, the band announced they were writing material for their eighth album, Lichter der Stadt. The first single, "So wie du warst", was released one year later, while the album itself came out in March 2012. The second single, also titled "Lichter der Stadt", came out the same month, followed by "Wie wir waren" in August.

In January 2013, Unheilig released a seven-CD box set titled Als Musik meine Sprache wurde. It consists of six discs narrating Der Graf's musical journey together with one disc of early tracks from his career.

=== Alles hat seine Zeit, Gipfelstürmer, and Von Mensch zu Mensch (2014–2016) ===
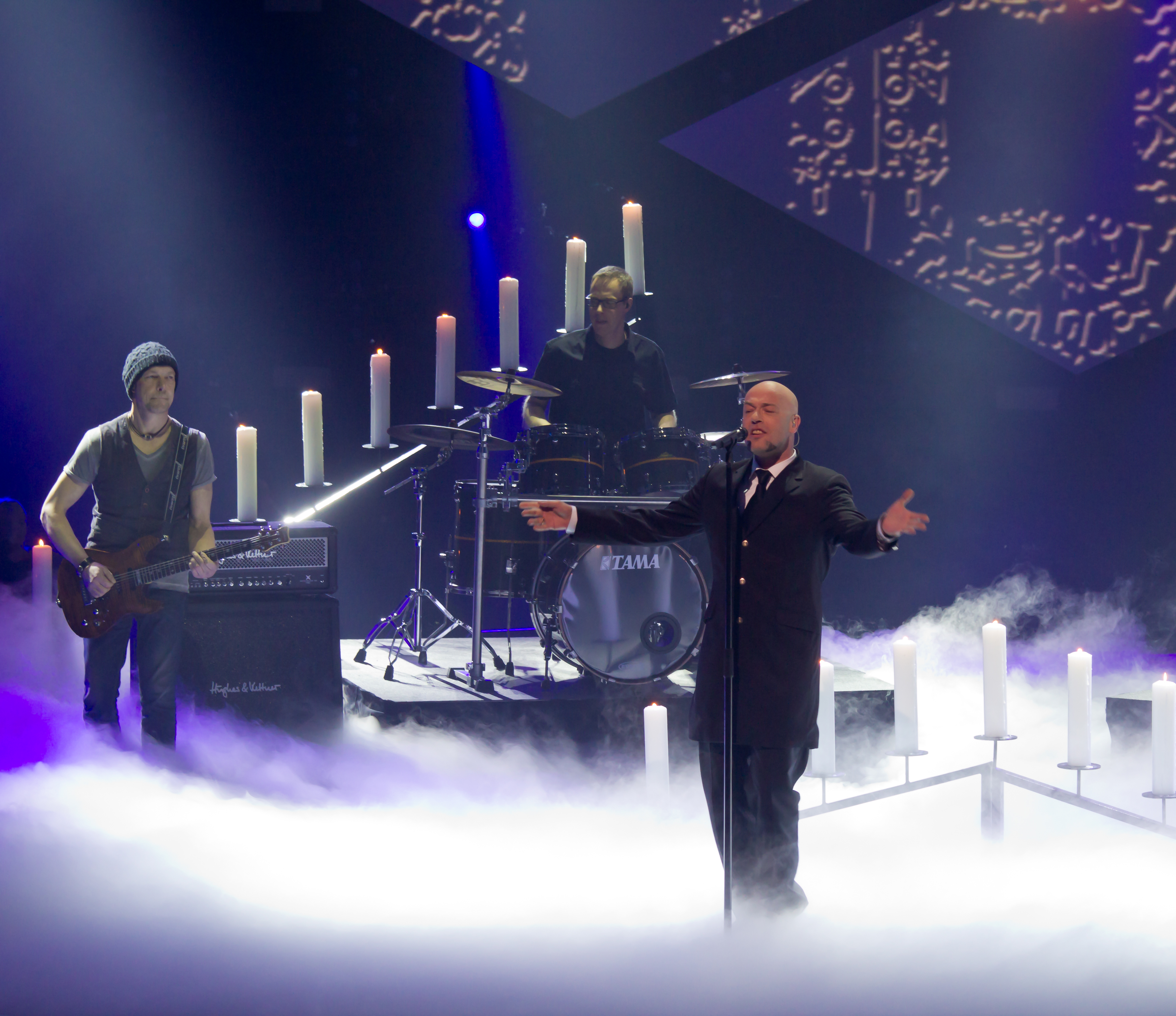
Unheilig performing in 2014

In March 2014, Unheilig issued their first greatest hits album, titled Alles hat seine Zeit. In October, they released the single "Zeit zu Gehen", the first from their forthcoming album Gipfelstürmer, which came out in December. A year later, they issued the DVD MTV Unplugged: Unter Dampf – Ohne Strom on 12 December 2015.

In August 2016, the band announced that they would release their final album, Von Mensch zu Mensch, in November. The first single from the album, also titled "Von Mensch zu Mensch", came out in August and was followed by "Ich würd' dich gern Besuchen" in September. The third single, "Mein Leben ist die Freiheit", was issued October.

=== Hiatus, return, and Liebe Glaube Monster (2017–present) ===
During their hiatus, the band issued several best-of albums, including Best of Vol. 2 – Pures Gold in 2017 and Lichterland – Best Of in 2021.

In March 2026, Unheilig released their first studio album in ten years, titled Liebe Glaube Monster, with the first single being "Wunderschön".

== Band members ==
Current

- Bernd "Der Graf" Heinrich Graf – vocals, programming (1999–2015; 2025–present)
- Henning Verlage – keyboards, programming (2003–2016; 2025–present)
- Christoph "Licky" Termühlen – guitars (2002–2016; 2025–present)
- Martin "Potti" Potthoff – drums, percussion (2008–2016; 2025–present)

Past

- José Alvarez-Brill – guitars (1999–2002; died 2020)
- Grant Stevens – drums, percussion (1999–2008)

== Awards and nominations ==
Year	Award	Category	Nominated work	Result
2010	Bambi	Pop National	Unheilig	Won
2010	Comet Award	Best Artist	Unheilig	Nominated
2010	Comet Award	Best Newcomer	Unheilig	Nominated
2010	Comet Award	Best German Act	Unheilig	Nominated
2010	ARD	Live Song of the Year	"Geboren um zu leben"	Nominated
2010	1Live Krone Award	Best Song	"Geboren um zu leben"	Nominated
2010	1Live Krone Award	Best Album	Große Freiheit	Nominated
2011	Diva Award	Artist of the Year 2010	Unheilig	Won
2011	Diva Award	Best Single & Album 2010	"Geboren um zu leben" & Große Freiheit	Won
2011	ECHO Award	Best Video National	"Geboren um zu leben"	Nominated
2011	ECHO Award	Echo Radio	Unheilig	Nominated
2011	ECHO Award	Most Successful Production Team	Unheilig	Won
2011	ECHO Award	Best National Rock/Alternative Group	Unheilig	Won
2011	ECHO Award	Album of the Year 2010	Große Freiheit	Won
2011	Swiss Music Award	Best Breakout International	Unheilig	Won
2011	Rainbow Radio Band Award	National Band 2010	Unheilig	Won
2011	Comet Award	Best Artist	Unheilig	Nominated
2011	Comet Award	Best Song	"Geboren um zu leben"	Won
2012	Prg Lea Award	Indoor/Arena Tour of the Year	Unheilig	Nominated
2012	Video Champions Award	Best Personality	Der Graf	Won
2013	Goldene Camera	Beste Musik National	Der Graf	Won
2013	Echo Award	Bestes Video National	"Wie wir waren"	Nominated
2013	Echo Award	Album of the Year	Lichter der Stadt	Nominated
2013	Echo Award	Best Rock/Alternative National	Unheilig	Won
2013	Echo Award	Best Music DVD Production	Lichter der Stadt Live	Nominated
2013	Echo Award	Best National Producer	Der Graf	Nominated
2013	Echo Award	Best National Act	Unheilig	Won

== Discography ==
=== Studio albums ===
Year	Title	Peak chart positions			Certifications
Year	Title	GER	AUT	SWI	Certifications
2001	Phosphor	—	—	—	
2002	Frohes Fest	57	—	—	
2003	Das 2. Gebot	—	—	—	
2004	Zelluloid	—	—	—	
2006	Moderne Zeiten	76	—	—	
2008	Puppenspiel	13	—	—	BVMI: Gold
2010	Große Freiheit	1	1	3	BVMI: 9× Platinum; IFPI AUT: 4× Platinum; IFPI SWI: 2× Platinum
2012	Lichter der Stadt	1	1	1	BVMI: 9× Gold; IFPI AUT: 2× Platinum; IFPI SWI: Platinum
2014	Gipfelstürmer	1	3	2	BVMI: 5× Gold; IFPI AUT: Platinum
2016	Von Mensch zu Mensch	1	4	3	BVMI: Platinum
2026	Liebe Glaube Monster	1	1	1	

=== Live albums ===
Year	Title	Chart positions			Certifications (sales thresholds)
Year	Title	GER	AUT	SWI	Certifications (sales thresholds)
2005	Gastspiel	—	—	—	
2006	Goldene Zeiten	—	—	—	
2008	Puppenspiel Live – Vorhang auf!	29	—	—	
2010	Große Freiheit Live	1	8	—	
2012	Lichter der Stadt Live	—	—	—	
2015	Gipfelstürmer Live	—	—	—	
2015	MTV Unplugged "unter Dampf – Ohne Strom"	2	10	8	BVMI: Platinum
2016	Danke! Ein Letztes Mal – Live	—	—	—	

=== Singles ===
Year	Title	Peak chart positions				Certifications (sales thresholds)	Album
Year	Title	GER	AUT	SWI	EU	Certifications (sales thresholds)	Album
2000	"Sage Ja!"	—	—	—	—		Phosphor
2001	"Komm zu mir"	—	—	—	—		Phosphor
2003	"Maschine"	—	—	—	—		Das 2. Gebot
2006	"Ich will leben" (feat. Project Pitchfork)	—	—	—	—		Goldene Zeiten
2008	"An deiner Seite"	49	—	—	—		Puppenspiel
2010	"Geboren um zu leben"	2	8	13	13	GER: 2× Platinum; SWI: Platinum	Große Freiheit
2010	"Für immer"	17	51	57	—		Große Freiheit
2010	"Unter deiner Flagge"	9	29	—	38		Große Freiheit
2010	"Winter"	4	6	64	21	GER: Gold	Große Freiheit (Winter Edition)
2012	"So wie du warst"	2	14	18	—	GER: Gold	Lichter der Stadt
2012	"Lichter der Stadt"	31	—	—	—		Lichter der Stadt
2012	"Wie wir waren" (feat. Andreas Bourani)	32	60	—	—		Lichter der Stadt
2012	"Stark"	23	49	—	—		Lichter der Stadt (Winter Edition)
2014	"Als wär's das erste Mal"	10	38	56	—		Alles hat seine Zeit
2014	"Wir sind alle wie eins"	29	—	—	—		Alles hat seine Zeit
2014	"Zeit zu gehen"	6	16	8	—		Gipfelstürmer
2015	"Mein Berg"	—	—	—	—		Gipfelstürmer
2015	"Glück auf das Leben"	—	—	—	—		Gipfelstürmer
2016	"Von Mensch zu Mensch"	—	—	—	—		Von Mensch zu Mensch
2016	"Ich würd' dich gern besuchen"	—	—	—	—		Von Mensch zu Mensch
2016	"Mein Leben ist die Freiheit"	—	—	—	—		Von Mensch zu Mensch

=== EPs ===
- Maschine (2003)
- Tannenbaum (as part of the Frohes Fest limited edition release) (2002)
- Schutzengel (2003)
- Freiheit (2004)
- Astronaut (2006)
- Spiegelbild (2008)
- Winterland Special (as part of the Große Freiheit (Winter Edition) release) (2010)
- Zeitreise (limited tenth anniversary tour-only release) (2010)
- Lichtblicke (exclusive Lichter der Stadt tour CD) (2012)

=== Compilations ===
- Alles hat seine Zeit – Best of Unheilig 1999–2014 (2014)
- Best of Vol. 2 – Pures Gold (2017)
- Lichterland – Best Of (2012)

=== Other albums ===
- Schattenspiel (2008)
- Gipfelkreuz (exclusive Gipfelstürmer tour CD) (2015)
- Weihnachtslichter (2023, Christmas album)

=== DVDs ===
- Kopfkino (2005)
- Puppenspiel Live – Vorhang auf! (2008)
- Sternstunde (Große Freiheit tour exclusive) (2010)
- Große Freiheit Live (2010)
- Lichter der Stadt Live (2012)
- Unter Dampf – Ohne Strom (2015)

=== Box sets ===
- Als Musik meine Sprache wurde (7-CD box set, 2013)
- Schwarzes Gold 2000–2014 (2015)
- Schattenland (2020)

=== Music videos ===
- "Sage Ja!" (2000)
- "Freiheit" (2004)
- "Astronaut" (2006)
- "An deiner Seite" (2008)
- "Geboren um zu leben" (2010)
- "Für immer" (2010)
- "Unter deiner Flagge" (2010)
- "Winter" (2010)
- "So wie du warst" (2012)
- "Lichter der Stadt" (2012)
- "Wie wir waren" (2012)
- "Stark" (2012)
- "Als wär's das erste Mal" (2014)
- "Wir sind alle wie Eins" (2014)
- "Zeit zu gehen" (2014)
- "Mein Berg" (2015)
- "Mein leben ist die Freiheit" (2016)
- "Der Himmel über Mir" (2017)
- "Sonnentag" (2017)
- "Lichtermeer" (2021)
- "Engel Der Verkündung" (2021)
- "Wunderschön" (2025)
- "Mein Löwe" (2025)
- "Spiegel" (2026)
