= Unter deiner Flagge =

"Unter Deiner Flagge / Geboren Um Zu Leben"

Single by Unheilig

from the album Große Freiheit
- Released: 24 September 2010
- Genre: Pop rock
- Length: 7:49
- Label: Vertigo Berlin (Universal)
- Songwriters: Bernd Heinrich Graf, Henning Verlage
- Producer: Der Graf

Unheilig singles chronology
"Für immer" (2010)	"Unter Deiner Flagge / Geboren Um Zu Leben" (2010)	"Winterland" (2010)

"Unter Deiner Flagge" (Under Your Flag) is the third single from Unheilig's album Grosse Freiheit. Like the previous two singles, it was released as a two-track single and a limited edition disc with a poster included.

== Track listing ==
No.	Title	English Translation	Length
1.	"Unter Deiner Flagge"	Under Your Flag	3:58
2.	"Geboren Um Zu Leben"	Born to Live	3:51

== Charts ==
Chart (2010)	Peak position
European Hot 100 Singles	38
German Singles Chart	9

=== Year-end charts ===
Chart (2010)	Position
Germany (Media Control AG)	74
