= Geboren um zu leben =

Single by Unheilig

from the album Große Freiheit
- Released: 29 January 2010
- Genre: Pop rock; Schlager
- Length: 7:53
- Label: Vertigo Be (Universal)
- Songwriters: Bernd Heinrich Graf, Henning Verlage
- Producer: Der Graf

Unheilig singles chronology
"An deiner Seite" (2008)	"Geboren um zu leben" (2010)	"Für immer" (2010)

Music video
- "Geboren um zu leben" on YouTube

"Geboren um zu leben" ("Born to Live") is the first single from Unheilig's album Grosse Freiheit and the sixth single of the band. As of December 2010, the single has been certified triple gold with 450,000 copies sold.

== Meaning ==
The song "Geboren um zu leben" was inspired by the death of a close friend of Unheilig's frontman, Der Graf. In 2008, the friend suffered a heart attack and stroke, from which he did not recover; Der Graf was with him when he died.

== Track listing ==
No.	Title	English translation	Length
1.	"Geboren um zu leben"	Born to Live	3:50
2.	"Ein letztes Mal"	One Last Time	4:03

== Music video ==
On 14 January 2010 the official music video for "Geboren um zu leben" was released.

== Charts ==
Chart (2010)	Peak position
German Singles Chart	2
German Airplay Chart	9
Austrian Singles Chart	8
Swiss Singles Chart	17

=== Year-end charts ===
Chart (2010)	Position
Ö3 Austria Top 40	8
European Hot 100 Singles	25
German Singles Chart	4
Swiss Singles Top 75	42
Chart (2011)	Position
Austrian Singles Chart	75
German Singles Chart	86
Swiss Singles Chart	64
