= Phosphor (album) =

Studio album by Unheilig
- Released: 19 March 2001
- Genre: Neue Deutsche Härte
- Length: 51:20
- Language: German and English
- Label: Bloodline
- Producer: José Alvarez-Brill

Unheilig chronology
Phosphor (2001)	Frohes Fest (2002)

Alternative cover
- Cover design for the 2009 remaster

Professional ratings
Review scores
Source	Rating
Release Music Magazine	6/10 stars

Phosphor is the first studio album released by the Neue Deutsche Härte band Unheilig, released on 19 March 2001. All of the artwork for the album is taken from the music video for the song "Sage Ja!". This is the only album by Unheilig with songs performed in English with the exception of a few singles, EPs, remixes and covers.

In July 2009, Phosphor was re-released with new artwork and a remastered audio track.

== Track listing ==
1. "Die Macht" ("The Power") - 4:05
2. "Willenlos" ("Will-Less") - 3:51
3. "Ikarus" - 3:25
4. "Sage Ja!" ("Say Yes!") - 4:03
5. "Armageddon" - 4:02
6. "My Bride Has Gone" - 3:51
7. "Komm zu mir" ("Come to Me") - 3:58
8. "Close Your Eyes" - 4:03
9. "The Bad and the Beautiful" - 4:04
10. "Discover the World" - 3:41
11. "Skin" - 3:36
12. "Stark" ("Strong") - 8:37
