= Für immer (Unheilig song) =

Single by Unheilig

from the album Große Freiheit
- Released: 21 May 2010
- Genre: Rock
- Label: Vertigo Berlin (Universal)
- Songwriter(s): Bernd Heinrich Graf, Henning Verlage
- Producer(s): Der Graf

Unheilig singles chronology
"Geboren um zu leben" (2010)	"Für immer" (2010)	"Unter deiner Flagge" (2010)

"Für immer" (Forever) is the second single from Unheilig's album Grosse Freiheit. It was released as a regular 2-track single and a limited deluxe version. The deluxe version comes in a digipak, includes a poster and is limited to 3000 copies worldwide.

== Track listing ==
No.	Title	English Translation	Length
1.	"Für immer"	Forever	3:22
2.	"Die neue Welt"	The New World	4:39

== Music video ==
On 30 April 2010 the official music video for "Für immer" was released.
