= Das 2. Gebot =

Studio album by Unheilig
- Released: 7 April 2003
- Genre: Neue Deutsche Härte
- Length: 53:15 (Album Disc); 26:25 (Maschine Disc)
- Languages: German and English
- Label: Four Rock Entertainment
- Producers: Der Graf, José Alvarez-Brill

Unheilig chronology
Frohes Fest (2002)	Das 2. Gebot (2003)	Zelluloid (2004)

Alternative cover
- Cover design for the 2009 remaster

Professional ratings
Review scores
Source	Rating
Gothtronic	(8/10)

Das 2. Gebot (German for "The 2nd Commandment") is the third studio album released by the Neue Deutsche Härte band Unheilig. It was released on 7 April 2003 in two versions, a standard 12-track edition and a limited double-disc edition. The limited, double-disc edition includes the "Maschine" maxi-CD as a bonus disc. The song "Maschine" was used in Project Gotham Racing 2 for the Xbox.

In July 2009, Das 2. Gebot was re-released with new artwork and a remastered audio track.

== Track listing ==
Album disc:

1. Eva – 4:40
2. Maschine – 4:05
3. Gib mir mehr – 3:38
4. Sternenschiff – 4:38
5. Vollmond – 6:43
6. Jetzt noch nicht – 4:19
7. Der Mann im Mond – 3:56
8. Schutzengel – 4:24
9. Rache – 4:38
10. Mona Lisa – 4:15
11. Krieg der Engel – 4:05
12. Herzland – 3:43

Tracks 2, 3, 10 and 12 were produced by José Alvarez-Brill, while the remaining tracks were produced by Der Graf.

Bonus "Maschine" disc:

1. Maschine [Club Edit] – 4:14
2. Maschine [Album Version] – 4:05
3. This Corrosion (The Sisters of Mercy-cover) – 8:39
4. Maschine [Der Graf Remix] – 5:16
5. Schleichfahrt – 4:07
