= Zelluloid =

Studio album by Unheilig
- Released: 16 February 2004
- Genre: Neue Deutsche Härte
- Length: 66:17 (Standard Edition); 74:32 (Limited Edition)
- Language: German
- Label: Four Rock Entertainment
- Producer: Der Graf

Unheilig chronology
Das 2. Gebot (2003)	Zelluloid (2004)	Moderne Zeiten (2006)

Professional ratings
Review scores
Source	Rating
Nocturnal Hall	4/5 stars

Zelluloid (German for "Celluloid") is the fourth studio album released by the Neue Deutsche Härte band Unheilig. It was released on 16 February 2004 in two versions, a standard 14-track edition and a limited 16-track edition. The standard edition is in a regular jewel case, with a black album color, while the limited edition is as a digipak, with a cream-white album cover.

Zelluloid is an autobiography of Der Graf, the frontman and founder of Unheilig. On the back of the case insert included with the album, Der Graf states (translated from German): "Zelluloid is a review of my past. Every song is a story from a moment in my life. Like an art film...how I viewed every moment."

In July 2009, Zelluloid was re-released with new artwork and a remastered audio track but the album cover stayed the same.

== Track listing ==
No.	Title	English translation	Length
1.	"Die Filmrolle"	"The Film Roll"	1:35
2.	"Zauberer"	"Magician"	4:10
3.	"Hört Mein Wort"	"Hear My Word"	4:50
4.	"Willst Du Mich?"	"Do You Want Me?"	3:46
5.	"Himmelherz"	"Heavenheart"	5:54
6.	"Auf Zum Mond"	"To The Moon"	5:58
7.	"Freiheit"	"Freedom"	5:22
8.	"Herz Aus Eis"	"Heart Of Ice"	5:08
9.	"Sieh In Mein Gesicht"	"Look Into My Face"	4:22
10.	"Mein König"	"My King"	5:16
11.	"Fabrik Der Liebe"	"Factory Of Love"	5:21
12.	"Tanz Mit Dem Feuer"	"Dance With The Fire"	5:33
13.	"Feier Dich!"	"Celebrate Yourself!"	4:48
14.	"Zeig Mir, Dass Ich Lebe" (Limited edition release only)	"Show Me That I'm Alive"	4:08
15.	"Wenn Du Lachst" (Limited edition release only)	"When You Laugh"	4:06
16.	"Zelluloid"	"Celluloid"	4:00
