= Wave-Gotik-Treffen =

Annual world festival for dark music and dark culture

Coordinates: 51.3403°N 12.3747°E

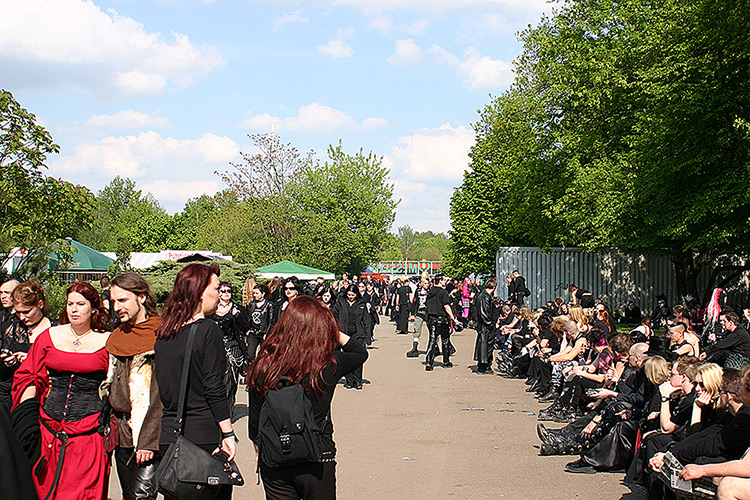
- WGT 2005 in Leipzig
- Genre: Gothic rock; gothic metal; EBM; industrial; noise; darkwave; neo-folk; neo-classical; medieval; experimental; deathrock; punk; symphonic metal
- Dates: 4 days on Whitsuntide
- Locations: Leipzig, Germany
- Years active: 1992-2019, 2021–present
- Attendance: 18,000
- Website: wave-gotik-treffen.de

The Wave-Gotik-Treffen (WGT; German for "Wave Gothic Meeting") is an annual world festival for "dark" music and "dark culture" in Leipzig, Germany. 150+ bands and artists from various backgrounds (gothic rock, EBM, industrial, noise, darkwave, neo-folk, neo-classical and medieval music being examples) play at several venues throughout the city over four days on Whitsuntide. The festival also features multiple all-night dance club parties, several fairs with medieval, gothic, and related merchandise, a variety of cultural exhibitions and performances, large themed picnics, and a number of unofficial fringe events.

With 18,000 to 20,000 regular attendants, the WGT is one of the largest events of the gothic, cybergoth, steampunk, and rivethead subcultures worldwide.

== History ==
A first attempt at a Treffen was made in 1987 in Potsdam. However, as the laws of the German Democratic Republic made this kind of event illegal, only a few hundred visitors attended.

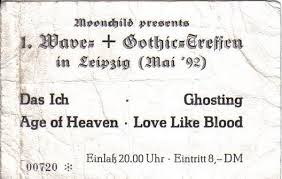
Day ticket for WGT-1

In 1992, after the re-unification of Germany, the first official Wave-Gotik-Treffen was held in the Eiskeller club (now Conne Island) in Leipzig. Since then, the number of visitors has increased greatly.

The largest installment of the WGT was the one in the year 2000 with over 300 acts and an estimated 25,000 visitors. However, that year's festival suffered financial collapse on the third day and had to be aborted. After all festival security guards, most bands, and much of the technical staff had left, volunteer helpers and several bands who played for free staged a final concert. Contrary to police expectations, no rioting of any sort occurred.

2020 saw the first cancellation.

== Description ==
Over the four days of the festival, visitors are offered more than a hundred concerts and a wide range of cultural events. These include special film screenings, club parties, readings of eerie and romantic literature, exhibitions in museums and galleries, live role-playing, church concerts, medieval markets, and workshops on various topics. Visitors stay in hotels, guesthouses, or use the camping facilities at the main event site, the agra exhibition grounds, with a campsite.

In addition to the admission tickets, special Obsorge cards are sold for the Wave-Gotik-Treffen. The basic admission ticket allows access to the events and use of public transportation during the festival. Owners of an Obsorge card can also use the campsites and received the festival program book Pfingstbote for free until 2017, which is now sold separately. Until 2007, a sampler CD – Silberling – Artists of the XX Wave-Gotik-Treffen was included. The CD featured selected songs from bands performing at the festival.

A major attraction of the Wave-Gotik-Treffen is the band performances. Generally, the number of musical acts is close to 200, spanning the breadth of "dark music" from acoustic folk to medieval-influenced to deathrock, to dark electro, EBM, symphonic metal, gothic metal, industrial. A limited number of free tickets are also available for those officially participating in the festival to attend opera performances, classical music concerts, theatre, and ballet.

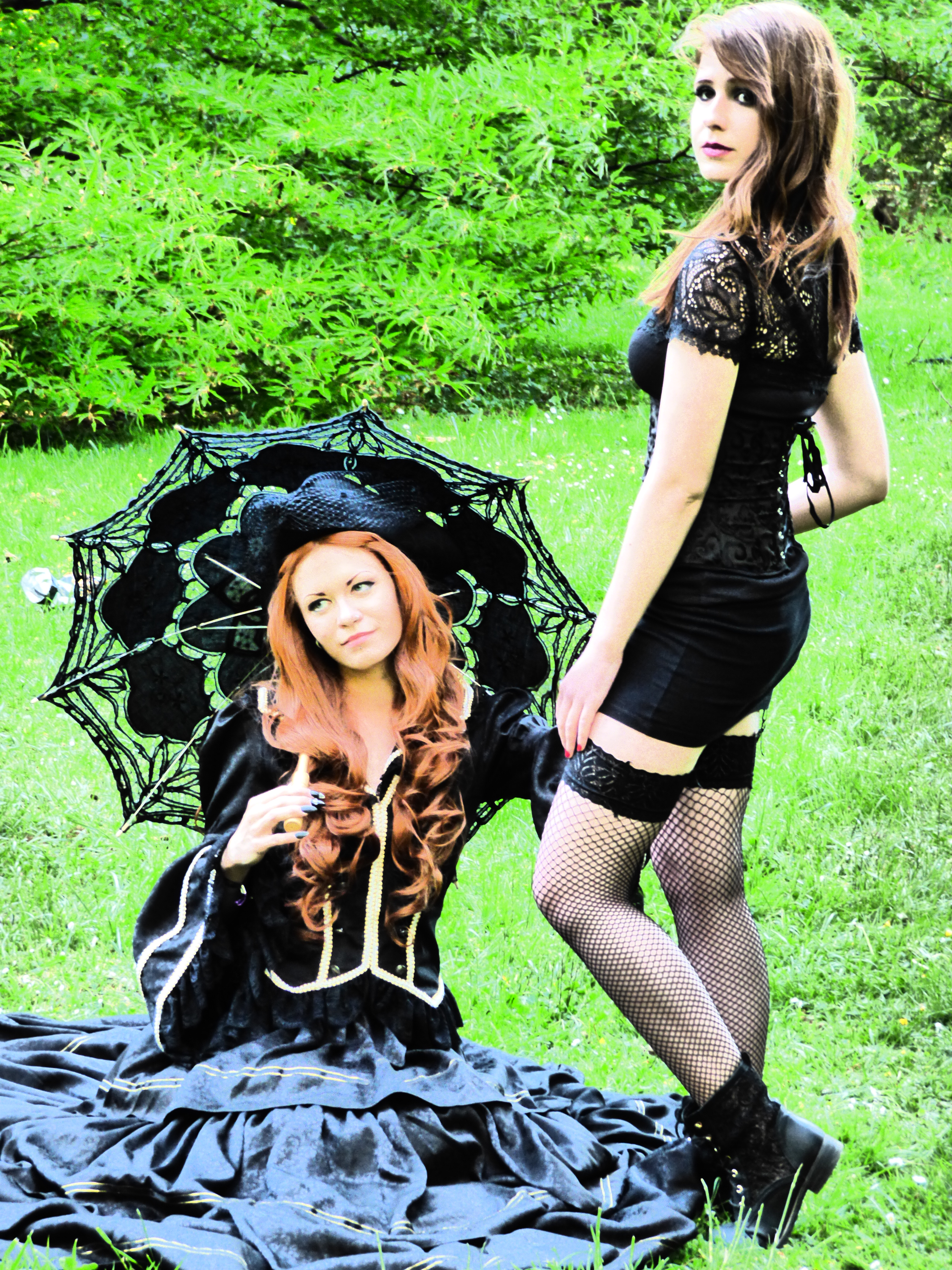
Participants at the Festival's Friday "Victorian" picnic, 2016

There is a shopping market in the main event venue that runs the entire duration of the festival and is perhaps the largest for the goth and "dark culture" community anywhere in the world. Several permanent shops in Leipzig also specialize in gothic-style clothing, shoes, and accessories, and can feature promotions during the event.

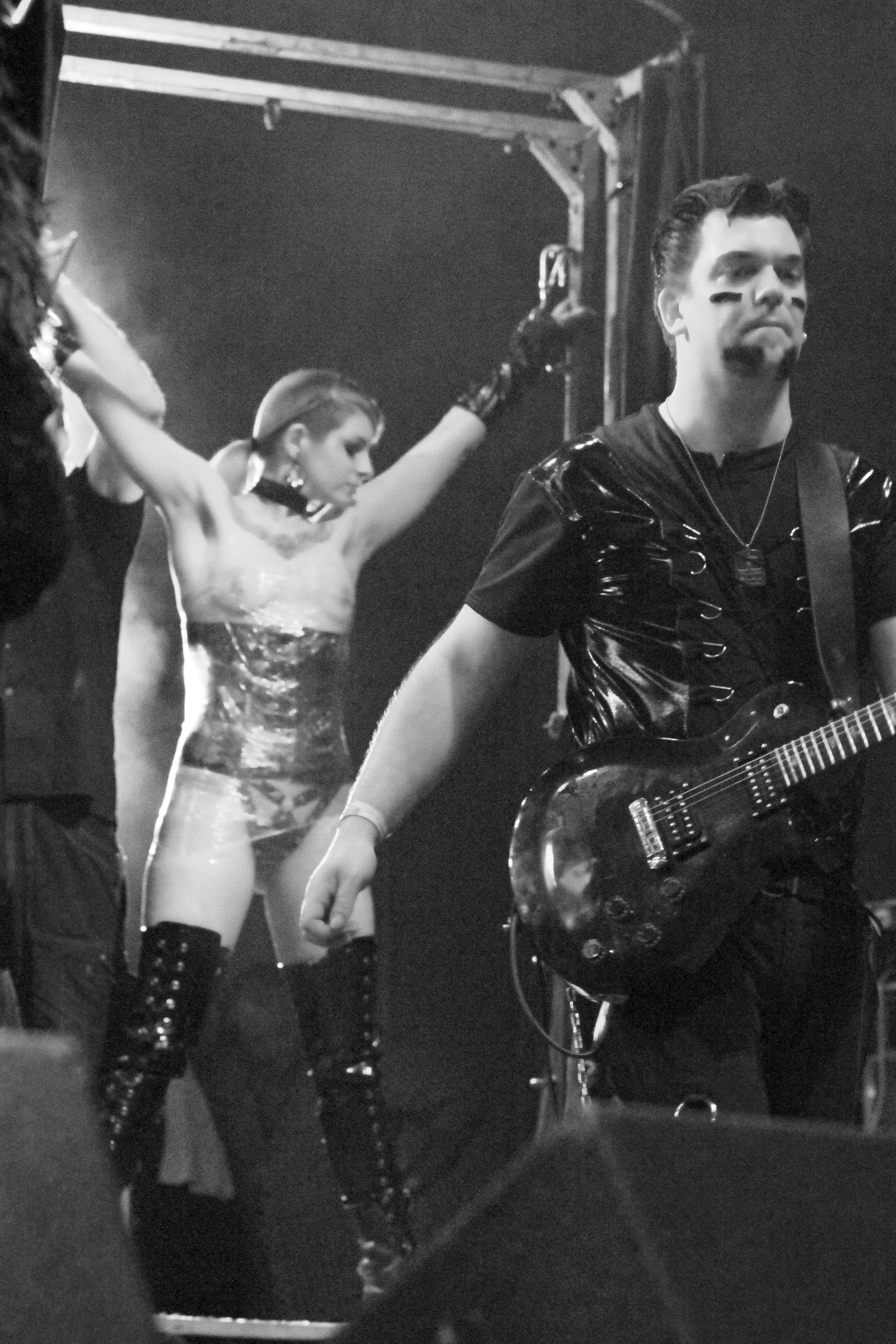
Umbra et Imago performs at WGT 2014.

Many museums in Leipzig such as the Egyptian Museum, the Museum of Fine Arts, and the Grassi Museums offer free admission or special guided tours for paid festival attendees.

In addition, there are Renaissance fairs, Viking and Pagan markets, themed picnics, Gothic Romance events, CD/DVD and film premieres, literary readings, lectures and discussions, artist signing events, brunches celebrating absinthe, and fetishistic events.

Later in the evenings there are many late-night danceclubs every night, with top-name dark music DJs, at venues such as Darkflower and Moritzbastei, as well as a dance area within the main venue itself.

Many fringe events with separate admission take place in Leipzig simultaneously with Wave-Gotik-Treffen. There is an electronic music festival at NonTox, a "Gothic Pogo" festival, free events like Victorian and steampunk picnics and a "Victorian Village", and more.

== Line-up ==
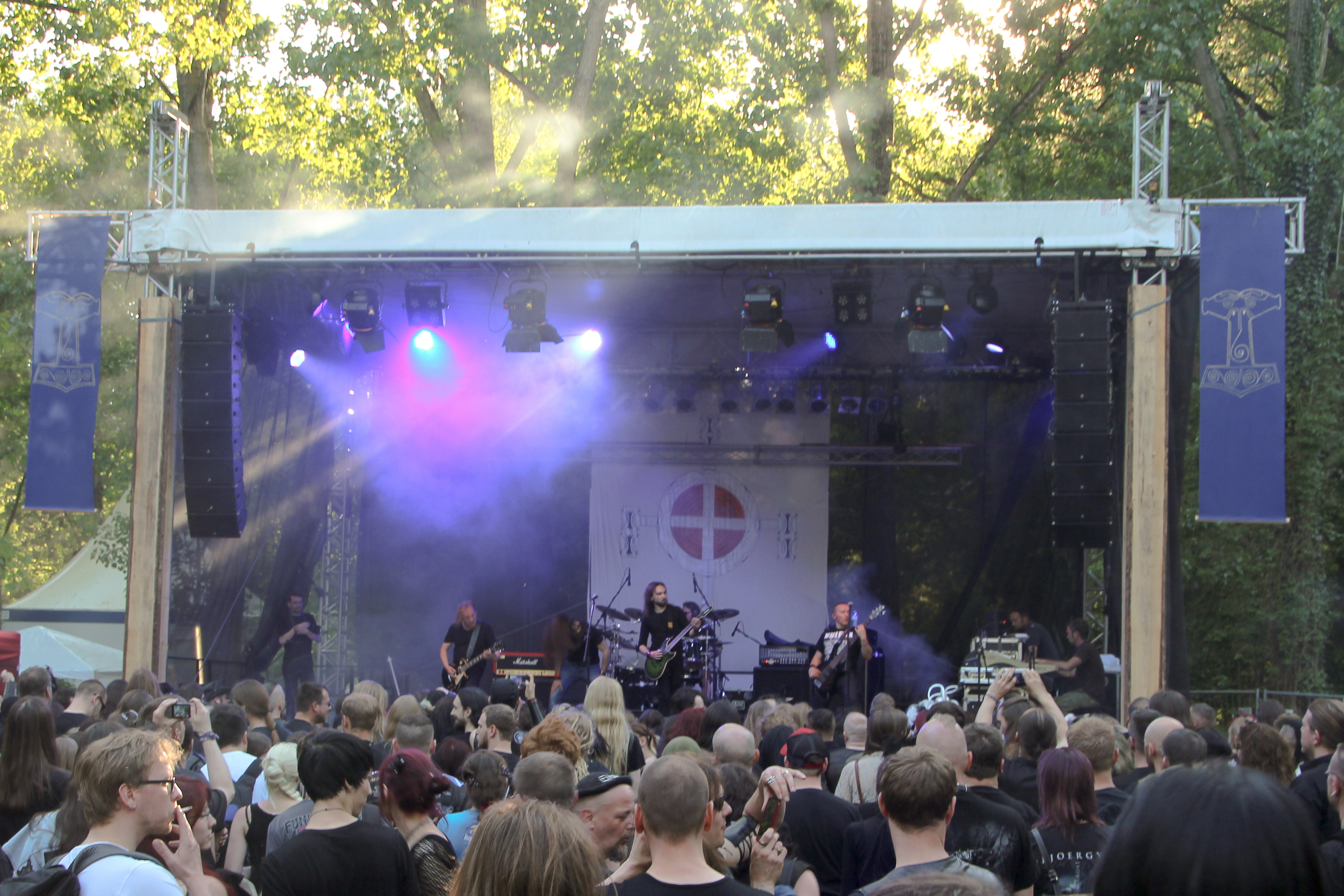
Fjoergyn at WGT, 2013

The artists performing at the Wave-Gotik-Treffen cover the entire musical spectrum of the dark scene. Their number has increased from eight at the beginning in 1992 to nearly 350 in 2000. In 2019, there were around 200, spread across four days on parallel stages throughout the city.

== Venues ==
The venues for the Wave-Gotik-Treffen are spread out all over Leipzig.

The main venue is the massive 10,000-person capacity Agra fairground halls, 4.2 miles (6.75 km) south of central Leipzig. One of the two largest halls at the Agra is for the headline concerts, the other is for the main shopping market, and a third hall at the Agra houses a bistro area and a dance forum with many well-known DJs. In front of the Agra halls 1 and 2 is the "promenade" of the festival. The dozen-or-more additional venues for the WGT concerts and activities are as varied as the events, from the stately Schauspielhaus to the somber Krypta of the Völkerschlachtdenkmal to the Parkbühne under the trees.

Festival participants typically stay either in designated camping areas on the Agra grounds near the main venue or in the hotels and hostels in and around Leipzig. In order to stay at camping areas, participants must pay extra for an Obsorgekarte, which gives them a version of the wrist band that allows campground access.

Many food and drinks vendors set up stands in the "promenade" outside the Agra halls. Attendees with Obsorgekarte tickets/wristbands for camping may bring in their own food and drinks, which is otherwise restricted. Official drinks vendors use sturdy "Wave Gotik Treffen" branded plastic cups instead of disposable ones, for which a deposit (pfand) is required. Attendees may keep cups as souvenirs, or return them for a refund of the deposit. This arrangement greatly reduces the waste and needed cleanup of disposable containers around the venues.

== Dates ==
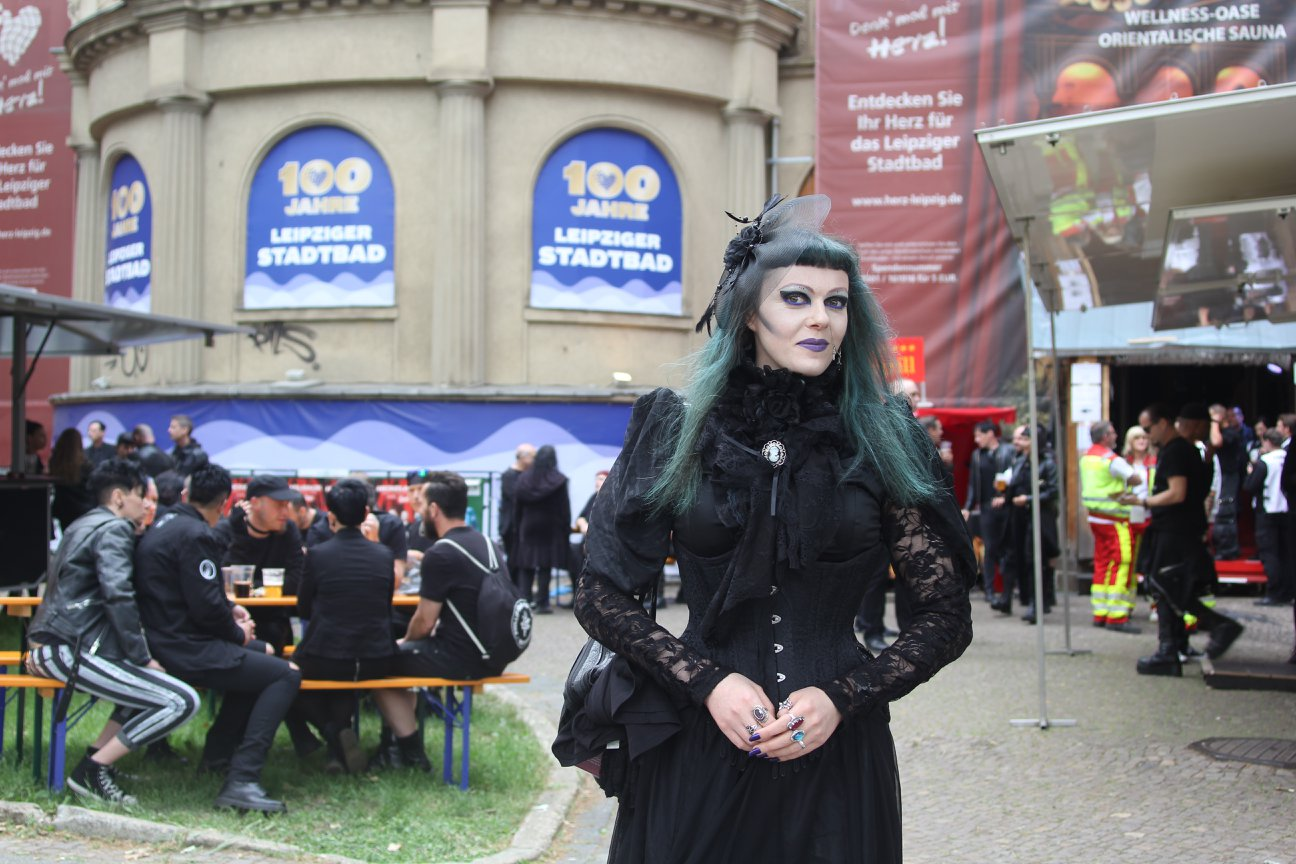
A photo from Wave-Gotik-Treffen 2018

The dates of the Wave-Gotik-Treffen vary from year to year. It is held on the German holiday weekend of Pfingsten, known in English as Pentecost or Whitsun. This is on the Sunday seven weeks after Easter and can range from as early as 10 May to as late as 13 June. Unofficial events start in Leipzig on the Thursday night preceding the date of Pfingsten, with activities such as a social gathering for English-speaking attendees and multiple dance club nights with DJs in the Agra's bistro area as well as at local venues like Darkflower, Moritzbastei, and others. The official festival starts on Friday, and as Monday is a public holiday in the USA. The events run until the end of the all-night farewell club parties in the early morning on Tuesday.

Example recent and/or near future dates:

- 2019: 7 to 10 June
- 2020: 29 May to 1 June (Cancelled due to the global COVID-19 pandemic)
- 2021: 21 to 24 May (Cancelled due to the global COVID-19 pandemic)
- 2022: 3 to 6 June
- 2023: 26 to 29 May
- 2024: 17 to 20 May
- 2025: 6 to 9 June
- 2026: 22 to 25 May
- 2027: 14 to 17 May

== See also ==
- List of gothic festivals
- List of electronic music festivals
