= Frohes Fest =

Studio album by Unheilig
- Released: 2002
- Genre: Neue Deutsche Härte; Christmas music
- Length: 68:26 (Frohes Fest disc); 31:30 (Tannenbaum disc)
- Language: German
- Label: Four Rock Entertainment
- Producer: Der Graf

Unheilig chronology
Phosphor (2000)	Frohes Fest (2002)	Das 2. Gebot (2003)

Alternative cover
- Cover design for the 2009 remaster

Frohes Fest (German for "Merry Celebration" in relation to a Christmas celebration) is the second studio album released by the Neue Deutsche Härte band Unheilig. It was released in 2002 in two versions, a standard one-disc edition and a limited two-disc edition (which includes the Tannenbaum EP as a bonus disc).

The album has several traditional German Christmas songs, including the popular "O Tannenbaum" and "Stille Nacht, heilige Nacht".

== Track listing ==
=== Frohes Fest ===
No.	Title	English translation	Length
1.	"Sternzeit (1. Strophe)"	"Sidereal Time (1st Verse)"	2:13
2.	"Kling Glöckchen klingelingeling"	"Ring, Little Bell, Ringalingaling"	4:11
3.	"Leise rieselt der Schnee"	"The Snow Falls Softly"	5:09
4.	"O Tannenbaum"	"Oh Christmas Tree"	4:32
5.	"Sternzeit (2. Strophe)"	"Sidereal Time (2nd Verse)"	1:28
6.	""Süßer die Glocken nie klingen""	"The Bells Never Sound Sweeter"	5:23
7.	"Als ich bei meinen Schafen wacht"	"As I Watch over My Sheep"	5:56
8.	"Vollendung"	"Perfection"	3:58
9.	"Morgen kommt der Weihnachtsmann"	"Santa Claus Comes Tomorrow"	5:03
10.	"Sternzeit (3. Strophe)"	"Sidereal Time (3rd Verse)"	1:30
11.	"Schneeflöckchen Weißröckchen"	"Snowflakes, White Skirts"	5:29
12.	"Still still still"	"Still, Still, Still"	6:36
13.	"Ihr Kinderlein kommet"	"Oh, Come, Little Children"	6:06
14.	"Stille Nacht heilige Nacht"	"Silent Night Holy Night"	7:00
15.	"Sternzeit (4. Strophe)"	"Sidereal Time (4th Verse)"	3:42

=== Tannenbaum EP ===
No.	Title	English translation	Length
1.	"O Tannenbaum (Single Edit)"	"Oh Christmas Tree" (Single Edit)	3:37
2.	"O Tannenbaum (Toxic Radio Edit)"	"Oh Christmas Tree" (Toxic Radio Edit)	3:14
3.	"Vorweihnachtszeit"	"Pre-Christmas Time"	4:09
4.	"O Tannenbaum (Der Graf Club Edit)"	"Oh Christmas Tree" (Der Graf Club Edit)	6:23
5.	"Knecht Ruprecht"	"Knecht Ruprecht"	5:15
6.	"O Tannenbaum (Toxic Club Remix)"	"Oh Christmas" Tree (Toxic Club Remix)	6:02
7.	"Weihnachtszeit"	"Christmas Time"	2:43
