= Agra (site) =

Building in Leipzig, Saxony, Germany

Coordinates: 51°17′00″N 12°23′10″E

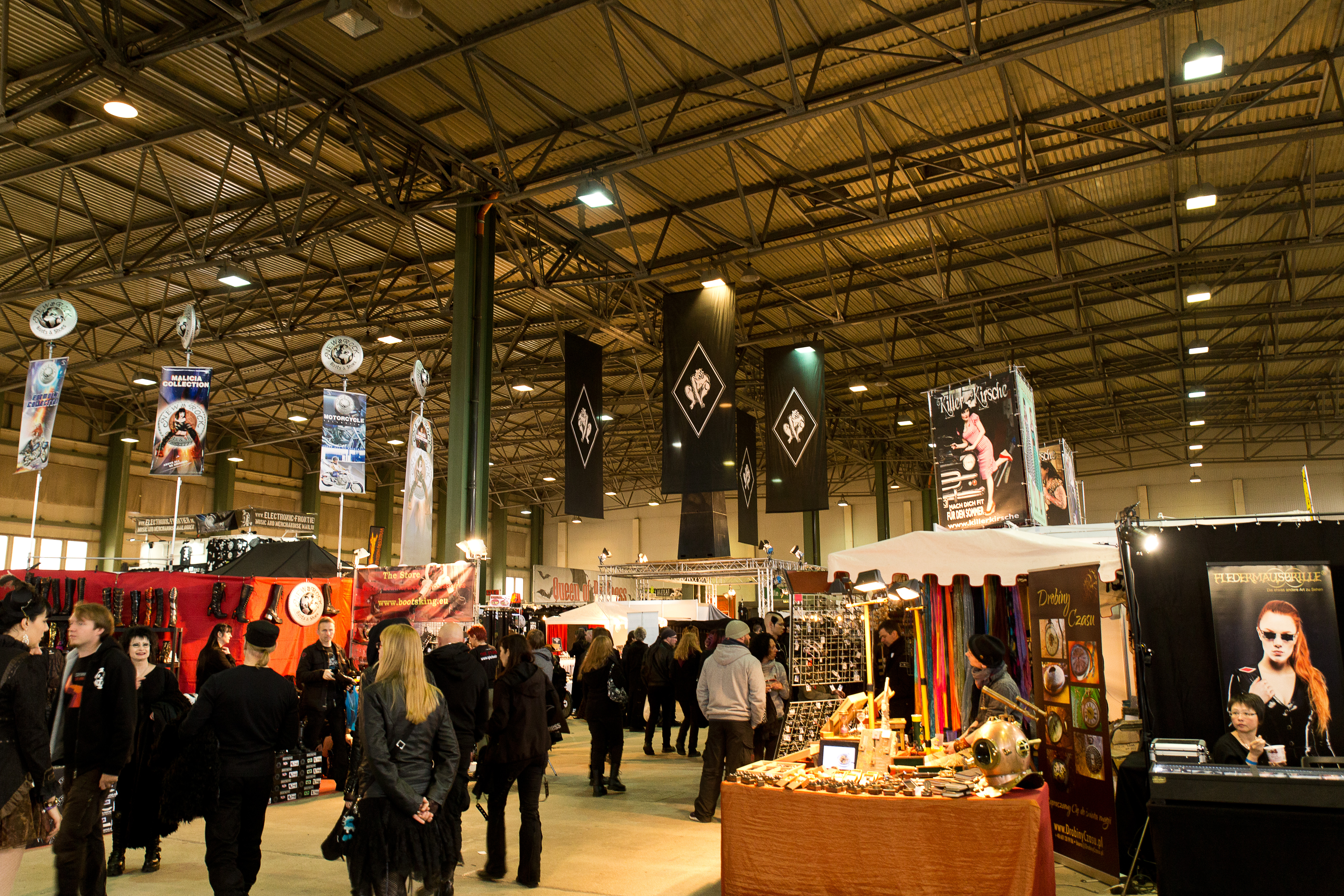
Hall 2 of Agra during the Wave-Gotik-Treffen

The Agra site south of Leipzig in Germany includes an exhibition center as well as a green space with a total surface area of 190 hectares (470 acres). The combination of a natural area and an event complex originated from the concomitance of a horticultural exhibition and an agricultural fair in the early years of the German Democratic Republic. The GDR agricultural fair named Agra gave its name to the site.

With a covered exhibition area of 13,000 square metres (140,000 square feet), a car park with 250 spaces and an annual attendance of 750,000 visitors, it is the second largest event complex in Leipzig after the Leipzig fairgrounds of the Leipzig Trade Fair in the north of the city. The landscaped park includes a number of monuments distributed between meadows, gardens, bodies of water and groves. The park includes museums, for example, the Deutsches Fotomuseum (German Photo Museum), the Dölitz gatehouse and the watermill on the Mühlpleiße river.

The site is intended for different types of fairs, exhibitions as well as festivals. It notably hosts the Wave-Gotik-Treffen, one of the largest Gothic festivals in the world, the medieval festival named Mittelalterlich Phantasie Spectaculum, the Tattoo & Lifestyle exhibition as well as the Fest der 25.000 Lichter (Festival of 25,000 lights), where the public comes equipped with lanterns, candles or any other sources of light. Every year in October, a historical reenactment of the battle of Leipzig takes place.

== Overview ==
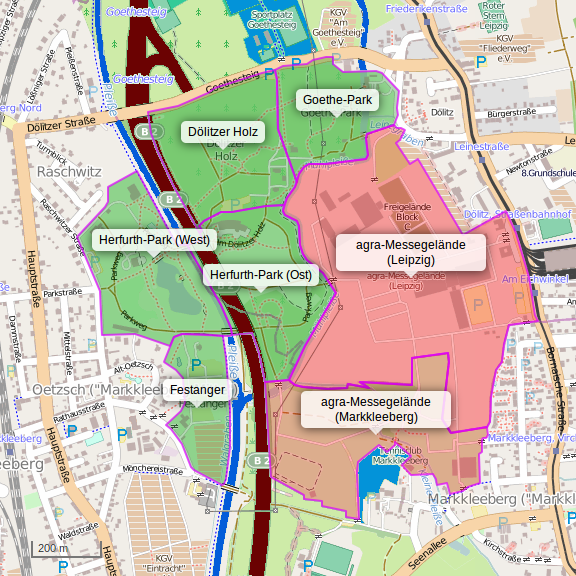
The site plan, with the exhibition center in red and the green spaces in green.

The agra is located in the Leipzig borough of Dölitz and in its western and southern parts in Markkleeberg. The exhibition center is accessed from the east side, via Bornaische Straße. The Bundesstraße 2 traverses the agra as an elevated roadway. There are discussions to build a tunnel instead of that. To the west of the park is the city of Markkleeberg and to the south is Markkleeberg Lake.

The 190 hectares (470 acres) of land are divided into two zones:

- the landscape park named Agra-Park extends to the north, west and south of the area. The northern park is made up of Goethe Park, Dölitz Wood (Dölitzer Holz) and the eastern part of Herfurth Park, named in honor of the landowner Paul Herfurth who inspired its design. The northern part is bounded by the Mühlpleiße river to the east (which forms the boundary with the exhibition park) and Bundesstraße 2 as well as the Pleiße river to the west. The southern part located in Markkleeberg is a green area between the Pleiße and the small Pleiße (Kleine Pleiße). The western part of the park is also covered by the Herfurth Park consisting of a pond, the “beech lawn” (in German language: Buchen-Liegewiese) as well as several monuments and museums.
- the exhibition center (agra-Messegelände) is located to the east of the area. It is notably made up of three T-shaped halls and open spaces. Hall 1 is 5,518 square metres (59,400 square feet), Hall 2 is 4,750 square metres (51,100 square feet) and Hall 4 is 3,000 square metres (32,000 square feet) (there is no Hall 3). In the middle of the three halls is a vestibule (ground floor) and a forum (first floor).

== History ==
The origin of the current site, shared and co-managed between Leipzig and Markkleeberg, dates back to the 19th century. In 1889, Paul Herfurth (1855–1937), a liberal publisher and politician, acquired a meadow between Städtelner Strasse (today Raschwitzer Strasse) and the Pleiße and settled there with his family. His family remained there after his death but the land was expropriated from them in 1945.

The first horticultural exhibition of local horticulturists was organized in 1948 on the site, which expanded significantly in the years that followed. Under the leadership of the agronomist Oskar Baumgarten (1907–2008), the first agricultural exhibition in the GDR was opened on site in 1952. Building on its success, the exhibition under the name of agra Markkleeberg will be repeated every year. The exhibition center was then developed.

After the horticultural exhibition moved to Erfurt in 1960, its site was transformed into a public park, which represents the center of today's park. Various fairs and exhibitions multiplied there and success was assured: the Agra events welcomed up to half a million people, including more than 10,000 foreigners from around a hundred different countries. In 1969 alone, the Agra received 750,000 visitors. Dozens of mobile halls and pavilions were erected each year.

After German reunification, the site lost some of its importance. Several fairs and exhibitions have moved to the newly built Leipzig exhibition grounds (opened 1996), including the agricultural fair. Since 2005, the green spaces and the exhibition park have been managed separately. It is planned that the natural space will be expanded to accommodate events that are more integrated into nature.

== Monuments and museums ==
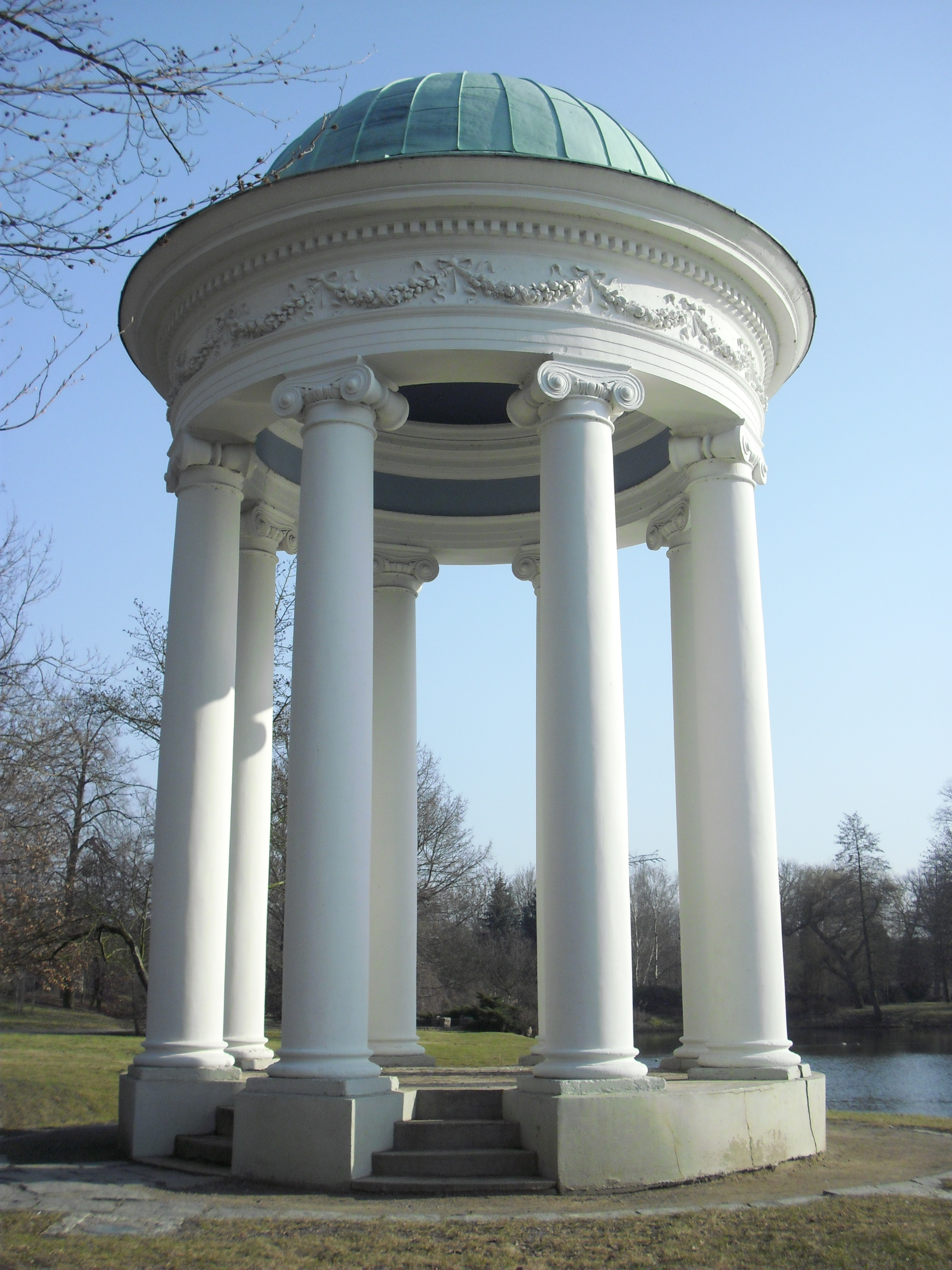
Monopteros

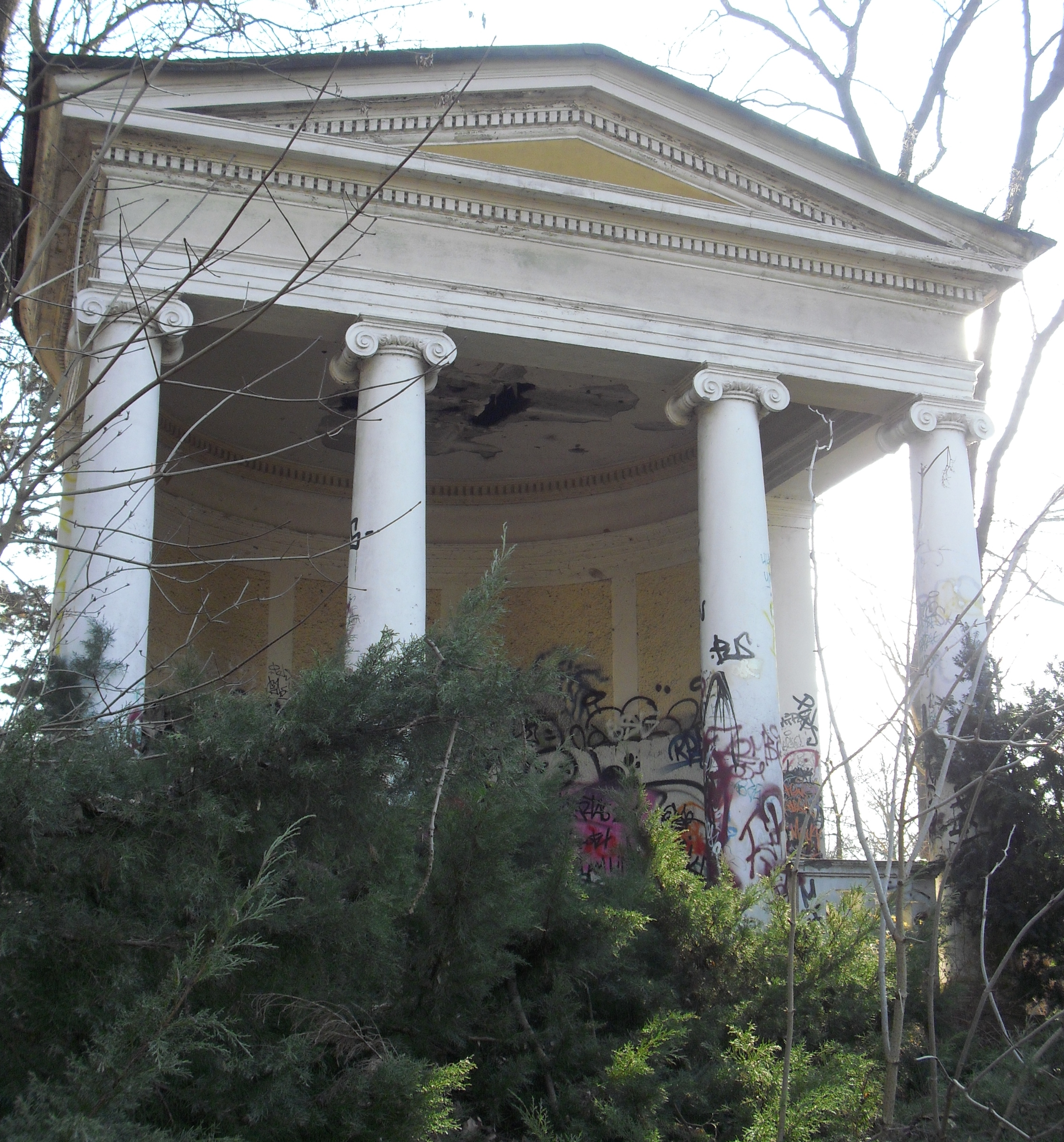
Antae temple

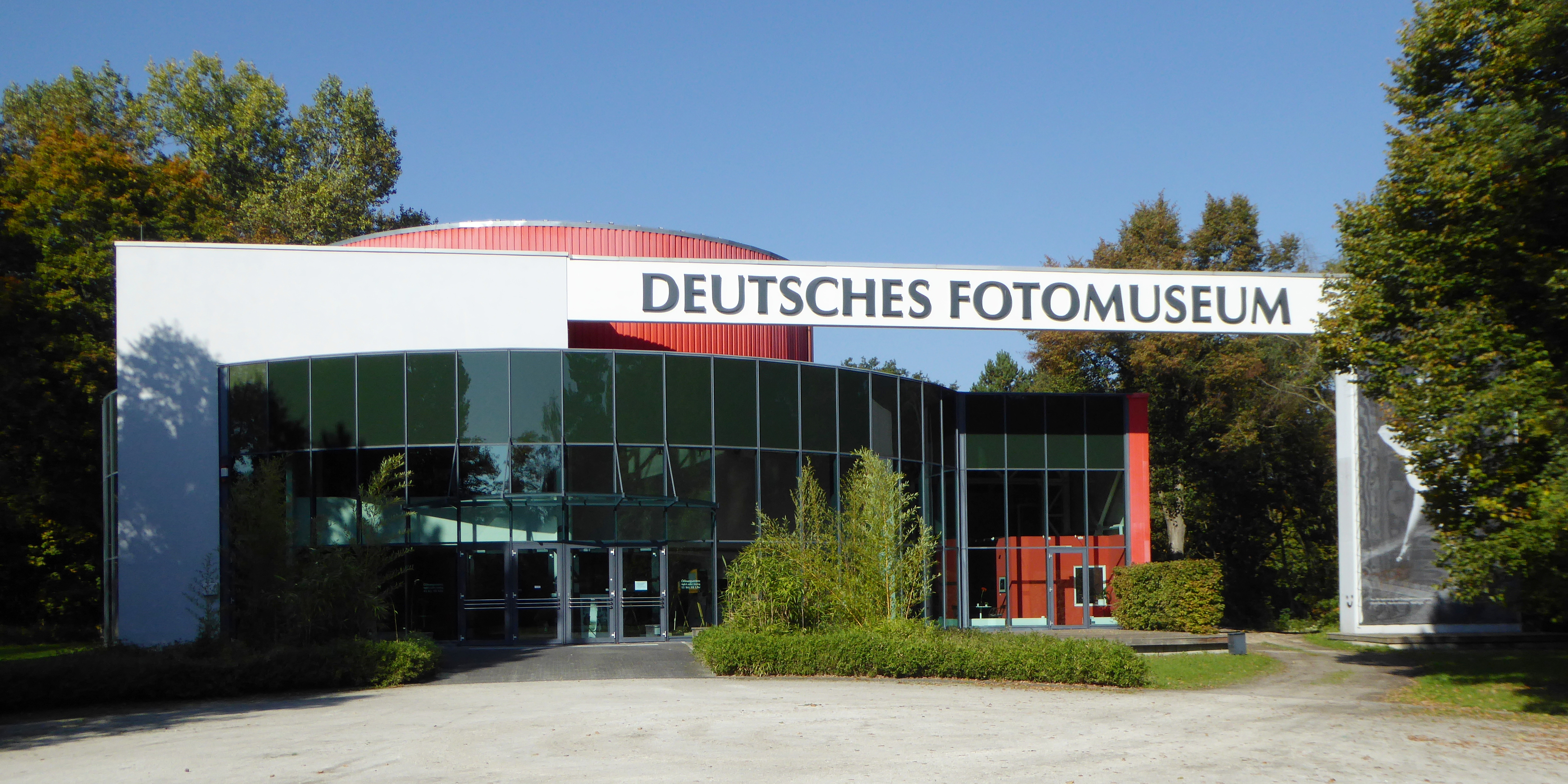
German Photo Museum

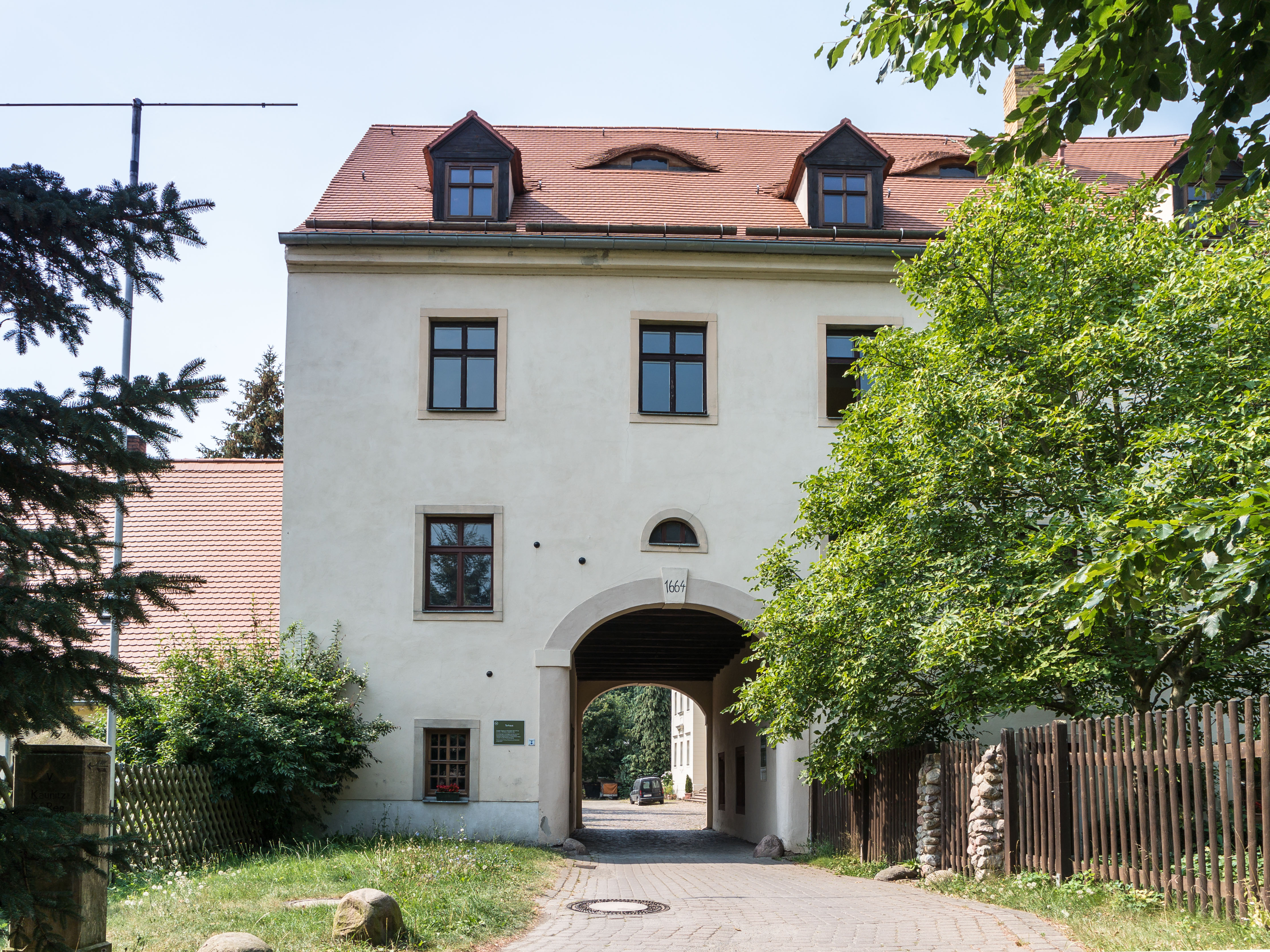
Markkleeberg Gatehouse with a battle of Leipzig exhibition

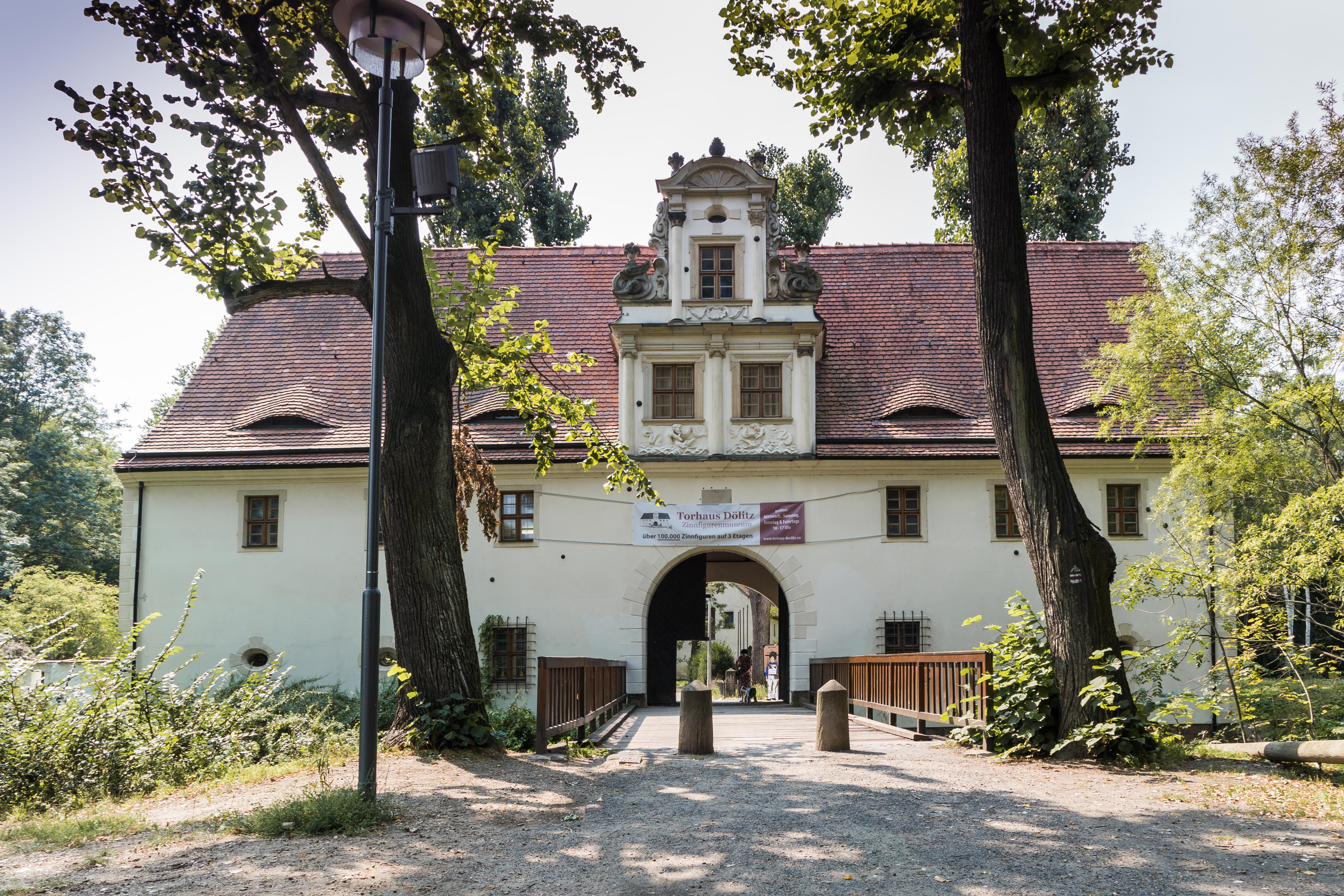
Dölitz Gatehouse with a tin figures museum

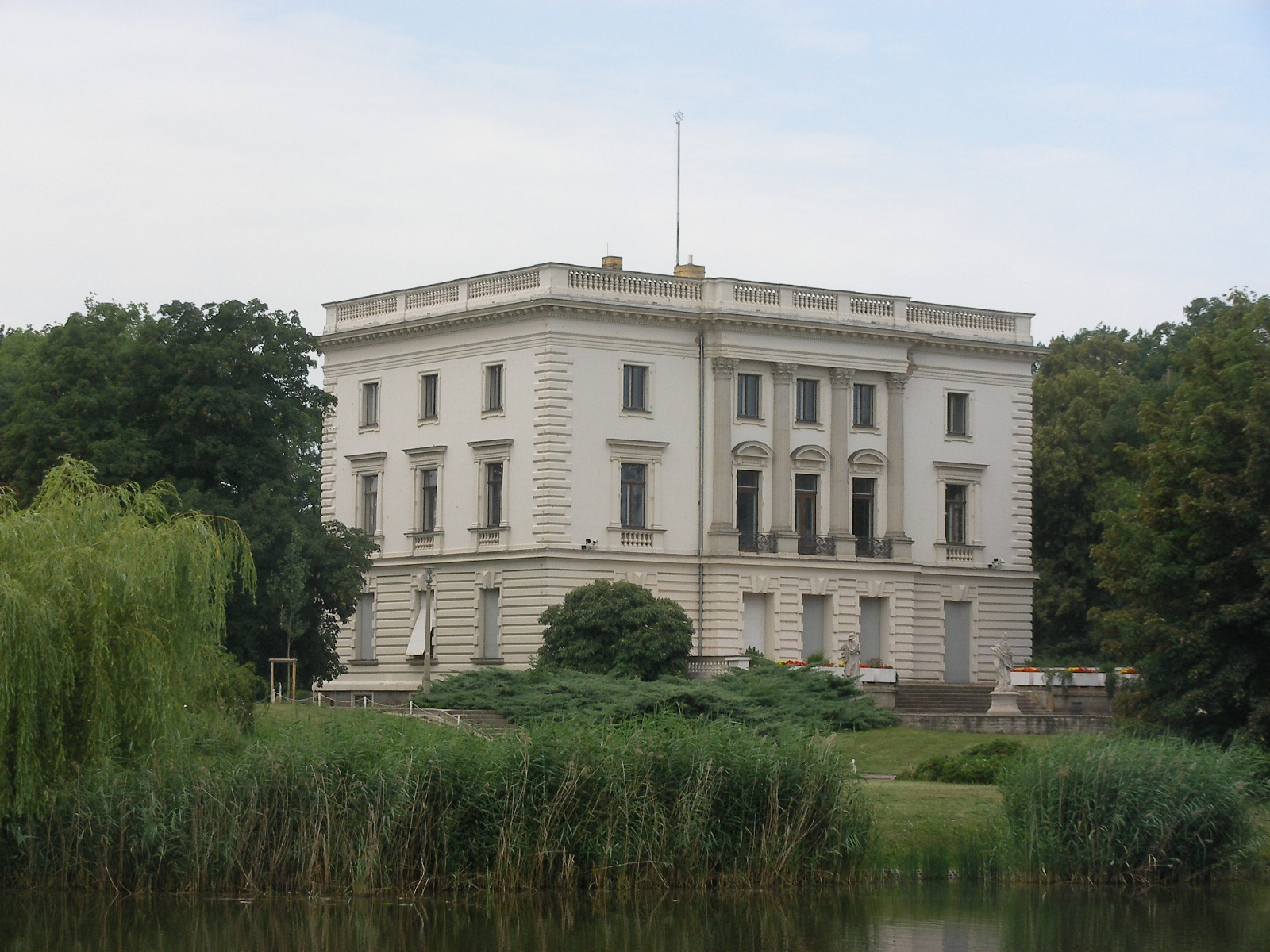
White House (Weißes Haus)

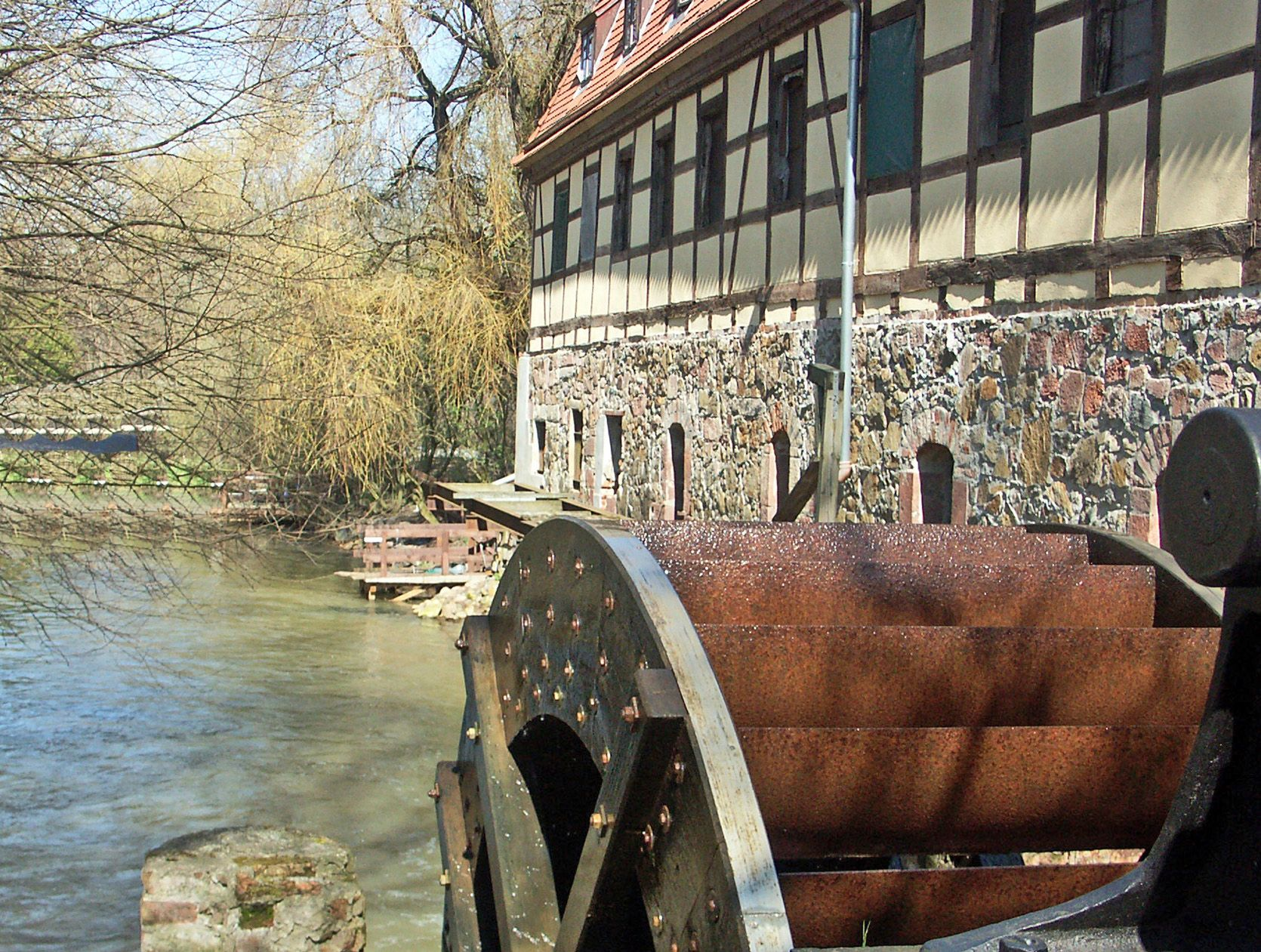
Döltz watermill

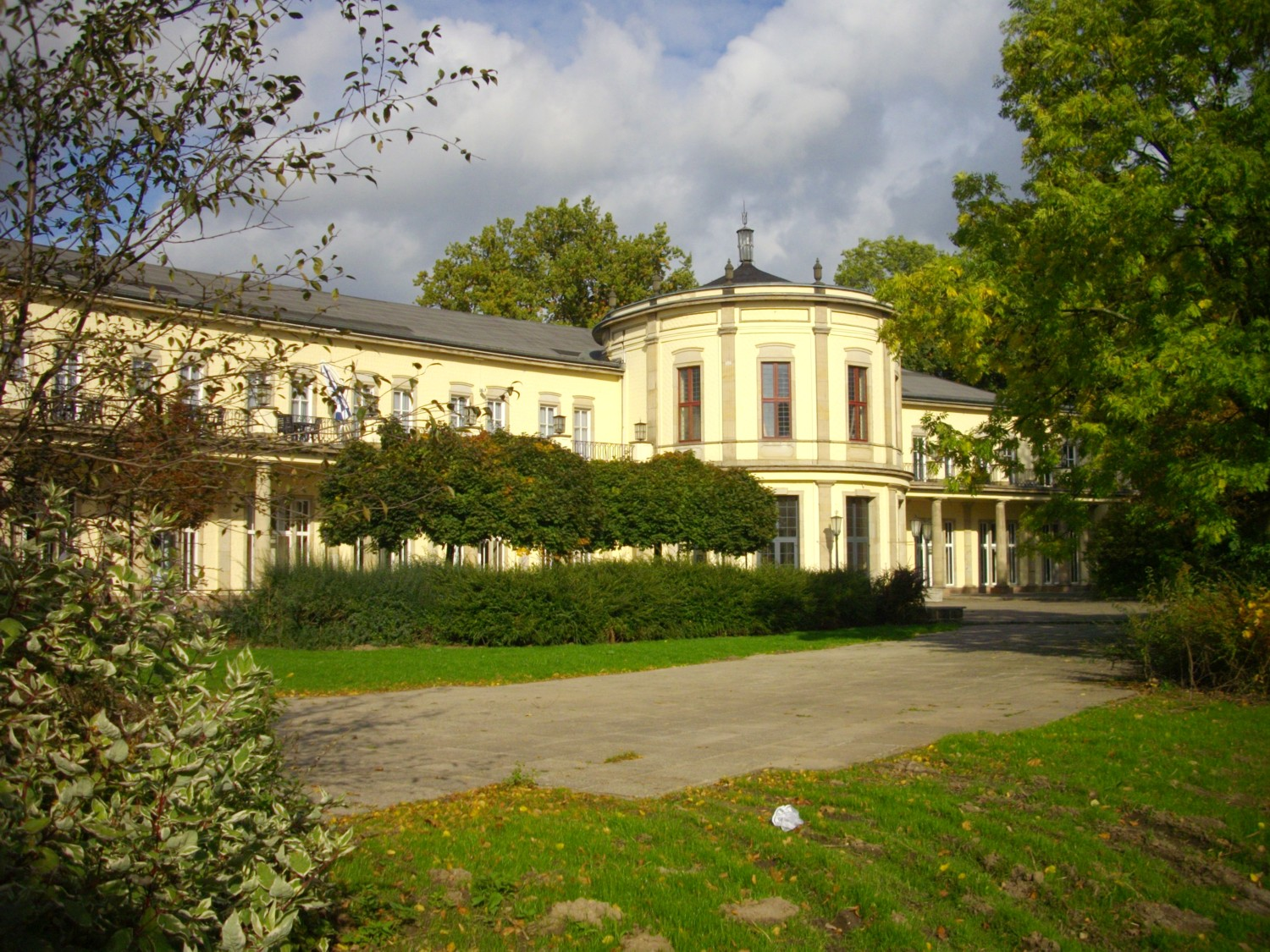
Park restaurant
