= Spiegelbild =

EP by Unheilig
- Released: 25 July 2008
- Genre: Neue Deutsche Härte
- Length: 36:59
- Language: German
- Label: Four Rock Entertainment
- Producer: Der Graf

Unheilig chronology
Astronaut (2006)	Spiegelbild (2008)

Spiegelbild is the fifth studio EP released by the Neue Deutsche Härte band Unheilig. It was released on 25 July 2008. It was strictly limited to 3,333 copies.

== Track listing ==
1. "Spiegelbild (Extended Version)" - 7:03
2. "Spiegelbild (Krupps Remix)" - 5:09
3. "Schlaflos" - 4:18
4. "Die Alte Leier" - 4:18
5. "Hexenjagd" - 4:22
6. "An Deiner Seite (Orchester Version)" - 6:13
7. "Spiegelbild (Album Version)" - 5:36
