= Lichter der Stadt =

Studio album by Unheilig
- Released: 16 March 2012
- Genres: Pop; pop-rock; alternative rock; gothic rock; Neue Deutsche Härte
- Length: 1:00:23
- Language: German
- Label: Vertigo (Universal)
- Producers: Der Graf, Roland Spremberg

Unheilig chronology
Große Freiheit – Winter Edition (2010)	Lichter der Stadt (2012)	Lichtblicke (2012)

Lichter der Stadt (German for City Lights) is the eighth album by the Neue Deutsche Härte band Unheilig. It was released on 16 March 2012. It reached gold status, with 100,000 copies sold in just 3 days.

== Track listing ==
No.	Title	English Translation	Length
1.	"Das Licht (Intro)"	The Light (Intro)	3:36
2.	"Herzwerk"	Heart Power	3.33
3.	"So wie du warst"	As You Were	3:50
4.	"Tage wie Gold"	Days Like Gold	3:34
5.	"Wie wir waren (feat. Andreas Bourani)"	How We Were	3:40
6.	"Unsterblich"	Immortal	3:59
7.	"Feuerland"	Fireland	3:42
8.	"Lichter der Stadt"	City Lights	4:15
9.	"Ein guter Weg"	A Good Way	3:53
10.	"Ein großes Leben"	A Great Life	3:34
11.	"Brenne auf"	Burn Up	3:48
12.	"Zeitreise (feat. Xavier Naidoo)"	Time Travel	4:00
13.	"Das Leben ist schön"	Life is Beautiful	3:42
14.	"Eisenmann"	Ironman	4:21
15.	"Vergessen"	Oblivion	4:14
16.	"Die Stadt"	The City	6:02

=== Limited Edition Track Listing ===
No.	Title	English Translation	Length
1.	"Brenne Auf (Demo Version)"	Burn Up (Demo Version)	3:35
2.	"Das Leben ist schön (Demo Version)"	Life is Beautiful (Demo Version)	3:33
3.	"So wie Du warst (Demo Version)"	As you Were (Demo Version)	3:22
4.	"Ein Grosses Leben (Demo Version)"	A Great Life (Demo Version)	4:18
5.	"Ein Guter Weg (Demo Version)"	A Good Way (Demo Version)	4:00
6.	"Herzwerk (Demo Version)"	Heart Power (Demo Version)	3:58
7.	"Wie wir waren (Demo Version)"	How we were (Demo Version)	3:41
8.	"Unsterblich (Demo Version)"	Immortal (Demo Version)	3:58
9.	"Vergessen (Demo Version)"	Oblivion (Demo Version)	3:17
10.	"Zeitreise (Demo Version)"	Time Travel (Demo Version)	5:00

== Certifications and sales ==
Region	Certification	Certified units/sales
Austria (IFPI Austria)	2× Platinum	40,000^{*}
Germany (BVMI)	9× Gold	900,000^{‡}
Switzerland (IFPI Switzerland)	Platinum	30,000^{^}
^{*} Sales figures based on certification alone.^{^} Shipments figures based on certification alone.^{‡} Sales+streaming figures based on certification alone.

== Lichter Der Stadt Tour 2012 ==
- 30 June - Meppen, Germany - MEP-Arena
- 1 July - Freiburg, Germany - XXX Lutz Freiburg
- 6 July - Magdeburg, Germany - Rothehornpark
- 7 July - Flensburg, Germany - Campushalle
- 13 July - Leipzig, Germany - Völkerschlacht-Denkmal
- 14 July - Nürnberg, Germany - Zeppelinfeld Nürnberg
- 15 July - Locarno, Switzerland - Moon & Stars Festival
- 20 July - Stuttgart, Germany - Cannstatter Wasen
- 21 July - Köln, Germany -Rhein-Energie-Stadion
- 27 July - Hannover, Germany - EXPO Plaza
- 28 July - Rostock, Germany - IGA Park
- 4 August - Zwickau, Germany - Flugplatz
- 5 August - Passau, Germany - Dreiländerhalle
- 10 August - Saarbrücken, Germany - Messe
- 11 August - Hemer, Germany - Sauerlandpark
- 17 August - Essen, Germany - Gruga Halle
- 18 August - Weilburg, Germany - Festplatz
- 24 August - Graz, Austria - Messe
- 25 August - Linz, Austria - TipsArena
- 26 August - Vienna, Austria - Stadthalle
- 1 September - Berlin, Germany - Kindl-Bühne Wuhlheide (Sold Out)
- 2 September - Berlin, Germany - Kindl-Bühne Wuhlheide
- 9 September - München, Germany - Messe München-Riem
- 21 October - Frankfurt, Germany - Festhalle
- 7 November - Vienna, Austria - Ronacher
- 11 November - Dortmund, Germany - Westfalenhalle
- 13 November - Aschheim, Germany - XXXLutz
- 23 November - Köln, Germany - Lanxess Arena
- 24 November - Halle/Westf, Germany - Gerry Weber Stadion
- 8 December - Saalbach, Austria - Snow Mobile 2012

=== 2013 Lichter der Stadt II - Letzter Halt Tour ===
- 9 February - Hamburg, Germany - O2 World Hamburg (Sold Out)
- 22 February - Erfurt, Germany - Messehalle
- 23 February - Chemnitz, Germany - Chemnitz Arena
- 2 March - Kempton, Germany - BigBox
- 3 March - Zürich, Switzerland - Hallenstadion (Sold Out)
- 7 March - Augsburg, Germany - Schwabenhalle
- 8 March - Salzburg, Austria - Salzburg Arena
- 19 April - Trier, Germany - Arena Trier
- 20 April - Frankfurt, Germany - Festhalle
- 10 May - Braunschweig, Germany - VW Halle (Sold Out)
- 11 May - Dortmund, Germany - Westfalenhalle
- 18 May - Laboe, Germany - Kurstrand
- 21 June - Kassel, Germany - Auestadion
- 22 June - Halle (Saal), Germany - Freilichtbühne Peißnitz
- 29 June - München, Germany - Tollwood Sommer Festival
- 18 July - Emmendingen, Germany - Schlossplatz
- 19 July - Straubing, Germany - Bluetone Festival
- 20 July - Dresden, Germany - Elbufer
- 24 July - Salem, Germany - Schloss Salem
- 27 July - Mannheim, Germany - Schloss Mannheim
- 28 July - Ludwigsburg, Germany - Residenzschloss
- 2 August - Refnitz, Austria - Festplatz
- 3 August - Tulln, Austria - Donaubühne
- 9 August - Munster, Germany - Schlossplatz
- 11 August - Zofingen, Switzerland - Heitere Open Air
- 16 August - Oldenburg, Germany - Freigelände an der Weser-Ems-Halle
- 17 August - St. Goarshausen / Loreley, Germany - Loreley Freilichtbühne
- 18 August - Norderney, Germany - Summertime at Norderney
- 31 August - Cottbus, Germany - Spreeauenpark
- 7 September - Mönchengladbach, Germany - Warsteiner Hockey Park
- 9 September - Berlin, Germany - IFA Sommergarten - Messe.

=== Clubshows 2012 ===
- 18 February - Bremen, Germany - Pier2
- 19 February - Düsseldorf, Germany - Stahlwerk
- 20 February - Dresden, Germany - Alter Schlachthof
