= Agberos International =

Studio album by BANTU
- Released: 7 July 2017
- Recorded: 2011–2017
- Studios: Rigmaroll Studio Lagos, Tasman Studios Lagos, DotSol Studio Lagos
- Genres: Afrobeat, Afrofunk, rap, jazz
- Length: 51:00
- Label: Soledad Productions
- Producer: Aman Junaid

BANTU chronology
No Man Stands Alone (2010)	Agberos International (2017)	Everybody Get Agenda (2020)

Singles from Agberos International
- 1. "Lagos Barbie" Released: October 5, 2017; 2. "Ká Máa Dúpé" Released: November 1, 2018

Agberos International is the 5th studio album by BANTU. The album was composed and written by all 13 members of the band. It was recorded live in Lagos, Nigeria, over six years. The title of the album Agberos International was inspired by Lagos public bus conductors known as agberos who attract customers to board their vehicles through their wild gesticulations and loud voices. The album was released on 7 July 2017 by Soledad Productions. The subject matter on Agberos International is centered around the Niger Delta crisis, oppressive Western policies and the blind African ruling class.

== Recording and production ==
According to band leader Ade Bantu the album took six years to complete. It was produced and mixed solely by Aman Junaid. This marked a significant shift from all previous BANTU album productions which were always handled by various producers and founding band members Abiodun and Ade Bantu. The writing and composing approach to Agberos International was unconventional and unique. Draft versions of songs where rehearsed and tried out live at the band's quarterly concert series Afropolitan Vibes before fine tuning and recording them. Agberos International was recorded in its entirety with live instruments (no beats where programmed neither where samples used). The sound of the album ranges from Afrobeat to highlife, jazz and hiphop. For their politically charged song ″Niger Delta Blues" BANTU recruited the services of Afrobeat co-creator Tony Allen on drums.

== Critical reception ==
Agberos International received positive reviews from contemporary critics. In his 4-star review for The Australian Tony Hillier said "BANTU’s fifth album sashays between the satirical and political without missing a beat — from highlife to hip-hop, from R & B to rap, from afrobeat to American soul. The band's music resounds with riveting rhythms of classic Brown and Kuti as brass players, guitarists, keyboardists and singers weave hypnotic patterns above pulsating beds and metronomic beats". Agberos International was voted ″CD of the week″ by German radio station COSMO. Referencing the band's concert series and music festival Dami Ajayi of Sabi News wrote "BANTU has put out a compendium of their best nights at Afropolitan Vibes on CD". Joey Akah of Pulse.ng summed up the essence of the album in his 4 1/2-star review as the complete African story saying "this project is best experienced as a tribute to our motherland, with love, activism, poetry and various shades of dance".

== Track listing ==
1. "Afropunk" 5:08
2. "Lagos Barbie" 4:26
3. "Ká Máa Dúpẹ́" 4:52
4. "Niger Delta Blues" (feat. Tony Allen) 7:32
5. "Má Kó Bámi" 4:10
6. "Ṣe Jẹ́jẹ́" 5:05
7. "Oní Tèmi" (feat. Wana Wana)5:22
8. "Stori Plenti" 4:17
9. "Anything For the Boys" 4:30
10. "Ilé (Africa)" 6:17

== Personnel ==
BANTU

- Ade Bantu (lead vocals, spoken word & rap)
- Ayomiku Aigbokhan (lead vocals on track 2, 5 & 9, backing vocals)
- Abigail Ireoluwa Allen (lead vocals on track 3, backing vocals)
- Damilola Williams (backing vocals)
- Peter Sadibo (bass)
- Olufemi Sanni (guitar)
- Babajide Okegbenro (keys)
- Dare Odede (drums)
- Akinkunmi Olagunju (talking drums)
- Abiodun "Wurasamba" Oke (percussion)
- Opeyemi Oyewande (trumpet)
- Dotun Bankole (tenor saxophone)

Additional personnel

- Olaolu Ajibade (drums track on 1, 2, 3, 5 & 6)
- Tony Allen (drums on track 4)
- Segun Atoyebi (alto saxophone on all songs)
- Ibrahim Oyetunji (agbero voice on track 1)
- Modupe Oke (backing vocals on track 1)
- Yemisi Gbeje (backing vocals on track 1)
- Ibukun Adetimehin (backing vocals on track 1, 2, 3 & 6)
- Aman Junaid (synth on track 2)
