= Afropolitan Vibes =

Concert series and music festival in Nigeria

Afropolitan Vibes Festival
- Language: English

Origin
- Meaning: Local Wrestling
- Region of origin: Nigeria

Afropolitan Vibes is a live music concert series & annual music festival in Lagos, Nigeria. The show was created by Ade Bantu and Abby Ogunsanya in 2013 as a platform to showcase alternative music. Every edition features three or four contemporary singer/songwriters, vocalists or musicians who perform mostly original works that are firmly rooted in African musical origins of Afrobeat, Afrofunk, Afro-hiphop, Afro-pop, and Highlife. All acts perform with the 13-piece BANTU collective No miming is allowed at the shows. From 2013 to 2017 Afropolitan Vibes had a monthly residency at Freedom Park, a former British Colonial Prison on Lagos Island. In May 2017 the producers of the show announced a change of venue to Muri Okunola Park in Lagos and that the concert series would now hold every third Friday of each quarter

== Notable performers ==
A cross section of performers that have performed at Afropolitan Vibes at least once.

- Burna Boy
- Victor Olaiya
- Yemi Alade
- M.I
- Shina Peters
- Nneka
- Falz
- Blitz the Ambassador
- Gyedu-Blay Ambolley
- Patrice
- Seun Kuti
- Brymo
- Keziah Jones
- Bez
- Daddy Showkey
- Salawa Abeni
- Temi Dollface
- Ebo Taylor
- Megaloh
- Akua Naru
- Orlando Juliu
- Siji
- General Pype
- Majek Fashek
- Chris Ajilo
- Fokn Bois
- Beautiful Nubia
- Praiz
- Waje
- Sound Sultan

== Afropolitan Vibes Music Festival ==
The maiden edition of a two day Afropolitan Vibes Festival was held on the 16th and 17 December 2016 in Lagos.

== Urban Sessions ==
The Afropolitan Vibe franchise also hosts smaller acoustic gigs called Urban Sessions. The show happens on an ad hoc basis and has featured Afro-German singer/songwriter Patrice, vocalist Brymo, and folk legend Blackman Akeeb Kareem. Urban Session was also featured as an integral part of the Afropolitan Vibes Music Festival. Singer/songwriters Falana, Aduke, Ayo Awosika, Mary Akpa, Nosa, Tomi Thomas, Keziah Jones, Kaline, Sina Ayinde Bakare, Jinmi Abdul and female vocal ensemble Adunni & Nefertiti all performed intimate unplugged or acoustic set. The performing acts were all interviewed by Ade Bantu before their respective sets

== See also ==
- Afrophilia
- Afrophilya
