= Bantu =

Bantu may refer to:

- Bantu languages, constitute the largest sub-branch of the Niger–Congo languages
- Bantu peoples, over 400 peoples of Africa speaking a Bantu language
- Bantu knots, a type of African hairstyle
- Black Association for Nationalism Through Unity, a youth activism group in the 1960s
- Bantu (band), a band based in Lagos, Nigeria
- Bantu (album), a 2005 album by Bantu
- Bantu FC, an association football club in Mafeteng, Lesotho
- BantuNauts RAYdio, a weekly radio program on KABF in Little Rock, Arkansas

== See also ==
- Bantu expansion, a series of migrations of Bantu speakers
- Bantustan, designated land set aside for black Africans in South Africa during apartheid
