= Fufu (disambiguation) =

Fufu is a dough-like food found in West African and Caribbean cuisines.

Fufu may also refer to:

- Fufu (album), a 1999 album by BANTU
- Fufu (dog) (1997–2015), a pet dog of Vajiralongkorn
- Fufu (Tanzanian ward), an administrative ward in Tanzania

== See also ==
- Foo-foo (disambiguation)
