= Adé Bantu =

Nigerian-German musician, producer and social activist

Background information
- Also known as: Adé Bantu
- Born: 14 July 1971 (age 54); Wembley, London, England
- Genres: Afrofunk, Afrobeat, fuji, hip-hop
- Occupations: Musician, producer, activist
- Years active: 1989–present

Adegoke Odukoya, better known as Adé Bantu (born 14 July 1971 in Wembley, London), is a Nigerian-German musician, producer and social activist who is the front man of the 13-piece band BANTU and the creator of the monthly concert series and music Festival Afropolitan Vibes which holds in Lagos, Nigeria. Adé Bantu is also the founder of the Afro-German musical collective Brothers Keepers. His band BANTU received the Kora Award (the Pan-African equivalent of the Grammy) for their album Fuji Satisfaction in 2005.

== Early life ==
Adé Bantu was born in Wembley, London. He is biracial, being the son of a German mother and a Nigerian father. In 1973, he relocated to Lagos, Nigeria with his parents Barbara Odukoya and Adeleke Odukoya. After the death of his father in 1986, he moved with his mother and 3 siblings to Germany. He is the elder brother of musician Abiodun.

== Career ==
Attracted by Germany's emerging hip hop movement Adé Bantu joined the Hiphop group Exponential Enjoyment with Goldlover D (Sini Demir), Double A (Mola Adebisi) and General GG (Götz Gottschalk) in 1989. He used the alias and stage name "Duke T".

Their single "Think for a Moment/Style Introduction"(Tan Tric 12") is the 3rd German hiphop release (1989). They went on to produce the first multilingual Hiphop album in Germany titled "Chop or Quench" (1993). It featured the pioneer German hiphop crew Advanced Chemistry. This was followed by a Free Jazz Hiphop album in 1993 with Peter Kowald, Sainkho Namtchylak and Peter Brötzmann titled "Expo's Jazz & Joy".

In 1993 he was approached by Fonk Free aka Moreno (Oliver Freyman) and DJ An-dré (André Schröter) and together they founded the band "Weep Not Child' releasing "From Hoyerswerda to Rostock" (Buback Records, 1993) and "Liberation thru Music & Lyrics" (Groove Attack, 1994). Their music clip "Je Ka Bere" was featured in the European campaign of Media Against Racism.

In 1996 Ade was invited by Jan Ü Krauthaeuser to contribute to the Cologne Carnival music compilation "Humba 2". This led to the formation of the band BANTU with his brother Abiodun aka Don Abi, Patrice and Amechi (Amechinna Okerenkwo). He officially changed his stage name to Ade (later to Adé Bantu after BANTU's 2005 album release). BANTU's debut album "Fufu" became an instant success in Nigeria earning them two radio hit singles "Nzobu" & "Fire Inna Dancehall". In 2000 after a wave of racist motivated violent attacks on foreigners which climaxed in the killing of Alberto Adriano, Adé Bantu set up the Afro-German musical collective Brothers Keepers. Their song "Adriano (die letzte Warnung)" (Adriano the final warning) was released in 2001. It became an anti racism anthem selling well over 220,000 copies and making it to the Top 5 of the German pop charts. An album titled "Lightkultur" was released as well as a Sisters Keepers single "Liebe und Verstand" (Love & Understanding).

In 2003 Adé Bantu, his brother Abiodun and German reggae singer Gentleman recorded the single "Rudie (Hold It Down)" together with UB40. In 2004 he released his group BANTU's much anticipated European debut album "BANTU". The album featured Don Abi, Sly Dunbar, Positive Black Soul and Pee Froiss from Senegal.

In 2005 Adé Bantu once again assembled Brothers Keepers for a second musical venture. Broadened by many Turkish, Italian, Swedish and German artists their album "Am I My Brothers Keeper?" went far beyond the success of its predecessor, directing rousing statements, biographical insights and critical irony at German society. With BANTU he released "Fuji Satisfaction" an eclectic mix of Fuji, hip hop, Dancehall, Afrofunk and Afrobeat that featured Nigerian Fuji singer Adewale Ayuba in 2005. It won critical acclaim and the Kora Awards as "Best Group West Africa" and "Best Group Africa" 2005. This amongst other things promoted his move back to Lagos, Nigeria.

In 2006 he performed with Afrobeat Academy Band during the 2006 FIFA World Cup in Germany. In 2011 Adé Bantu's group BANTU released "No Man Stands Alone" an album of collaborations which was mostly recorded in Nigeria. The album featured Highlife music legend Fatai Rolling Dollar, Sound Sultan and Nigerian-German singer Nneka

Adé Bantu is the creator of Afropolitan Vibes a live music concert series & annual music festival that features alternative music acts alongside Nigerian and African music legends

The 13-piece BANTU collective released Agberos International in 2017. The 10-track album was produced by Aman Junaid. It features Tony Allen and Nigerian spoken word poet Wana Wana. In September 2020 BANTU released Everybody Get Agenda a long player that showcases the band's tightly knit horn section accompanied by driving rhythms and socio political lyrics that address issues of police brutality, corruption, urban alienation, xenophobia and migration. The album also features Afrobeat artist Seun Kuti on the song "Yeye Theory". in June 2023 BANTU released their 7th studio album What Is Your Breaking Point?The album featured a unique fusion of Afrobeat, Afrofunk and various Yourba musical influences. It also explored themes of post-colonial trauma, Africa's brain drain, gender oppression and social class discrimination.

=== TV and film appearances ===
Adé Bantu was featured in the cinema documentary, Yes I Am, a documentary on Afro Germans directed by Sven Halfar.

He also appeared with BANTU in an episode of the German soap Lindenstraße (Episode 710).

Adé Bantu appeared in Harry Belafonte's documentary film Sing Your Song.

In 2012, Adé Bantu joined the panel of judges of Project Fame West Africa, a music TV reality show. He worked on the show till 2015

== Politics and activism ==
Adé Bantu is politically active both in Nigeria and Germany. He was the founder of the now defunct Brothers Keepers e.V., an NGO in Germany affiliated with the Brothers Keepers musical project that visited schools, lobbied for changes in asylum and anti-discrimination laws and helped victims of racist motivated attacks.

He was involved in the Anti Shell campaign in Germany and co-initiated the Ken Saro-Wiwa week in 1997.

Adé Bantu is an activist, lecturer and public speaker who addresses racism against people of colour, AfroGermans and Africans in Germany as well as social issues in Nigeria. He was invited by German Minister for Foreign Affairs Frank-Walter Steinmeier on his first official visit to Africa in August 2007. He participated in the Partnership for Africa Forum hosted by President of Germany Horst Köhler in November 2007. Adé Bantu and his band BANTU have partaken in intercultural exchange programmes with the Goethe-Institut and the German Federal Foreign Office giving concerts and workshops in Ghana, Uganda, Tanzania and Nigeria.

Adé Bantu was at the forefront of the debate against the use of the N-word in Germany. He initiated a petition (with Brothers Keepers) against German Rapper B-Tight's album "Neger, Neger" (Nigger, Nigger) in 2007.

He is the co-founder and creative director of BornTroWay, a community arts project targeted at disadvantaged youths in major African cities. The project was launched in Ajegunle, Lagos in 2011.

=== Radio ===
Adé Bantu was a radio host at Deutsche Welle. He hosted "Good Morning Africa" from 1997 to 2000. He co-directed Nigerian-German hip hop/soul singer Nneka's video "Africans".

== Awards ==
Adé Bantu was awarded the Nordrhein Westphalia Cultural Prize in 1997 for the hip hop musical "Coloured Children" a piece he wrote and co-directed with Anita Berger. With Brothers Keepers he was awarded the 1LIVE Krone Radio Award for "Adriano (die Letzte Warnung)" in the category "Best Single of the year 2001".

== Discography ==
=== With Exponential Enjoyment ===
- 1989 Style Introduction-12 inch (Tantric/VeraBra Rec)
- 1993 Chop or Quench (Deep 6 Rec)
- 1993 Expo's Jazz & Joy (VeraBra Records)

=== With Weep Not Child ===
- 1993 From Hoyerswerda To Rostock (Buback Records)
- 1994 Liberation Thru Music & Lyrics (Groove Attack Records)
- 1998 Goal ( 12" Chlodwig/BMG)

=== With BANTU ===
- 1999 Fufu (Kennis Music Nigeria)
- 2004 BANTU (Nitty Gritty Music/ Rough Trade)
- 2005 Fuji Satisfaction (Piranha Rec)
- 2008 BANTU (X3M Music, Nigeria)
- 2011 No Man Stands Alone (Pako Records)
- 2017 Agberos International (Soledad Productions)
- 2020 Everybody Get Agenda (Soledad Productions)
- 2023 What Is Your Breaking Point? (Soledad Productions)

=== With Brothers Keepers ===
- 2001 Adriano-Single(WEA Rec)
- 2001 Lightkultur (WEA Rec)
- 2005 Bereit- Single(Sony)
- 2005 Am I My Brothers Keeper?"(Sony)

=== Collaborations ===
- 1990 "Kickin The Facts" (from LSD album "Watchout for the 3rd Rail")
- 1994 "Keep in Line & Sunshine" (from Di Iries self-titled album)
- 1995 "Late Night" (from Reiner Witzel's "Passage to the ear")
- 1995 "Illusion" (from Kastrierte Philosophen album "Soldier")
- 1996 "Polyglot Poets" (from Advanced Chemistry's self-titled album)
- 1997 "The Message" (from Two Step Forward project)
- 1997 "Colonial Mentality" (from Schäl Sick Brass Band album "Majnoun")
- 1999 "Tschupun"(from Schäl Sick Brass Band album "Tschupun")
- 2000 "Maza Meze" (from Schäl Sick Brass Band album "Maza Meze")
- 2002 "Rubber Dub" (from Schäl Sick Brass Band album "Kesh Mesh")
- 2003 "Rudie (Hold It Down)" (UB40 single featuring Gentleman & Don Abi)
- 2006 "Odolayé" (from "Lagos Stori Plenti" sampler featuring Dede, Mode9 & Azadus)

== Cinema ==
Halfer Sven, Yes I Am Brothers Keepers documentary on DVD, Arthouse 2007

== Sources ==
English Sources:

- https://web.archive.org/web/20080219063151/http://www.jamati.com/online/?p=953
- bbc.co.uk
- https://web.archive.org/web/20110718031957/http://atlanticreview.org/archives/592-Black-History-Month-in-Germany.html
- http://blog.derbraunemob.info/stoppt-den-weisen-n-wumbaba/stop-the-white-n-wumbaba/

Publications in German:

- Loh Hannes & Güngör Murat (2002). Fear of A Kanak Planet. Hannibal Verlag, Austria
- Verlan Sascha & Loh Hannes (2000). 20 Jahre Hiphop in Deutschland. Hannibal Verlag, Austria
- Kreide-Damani Ingrid (1996). 101 Nationen einer Stadt. Dumont Verlag, Germany
- Schergel Frank (2002). Ohne Musik ist quasi alles lau.Verlag Kiepenheuer & Witsch, Germany
