= Fuji Satisfaction =

Studio album by BANTU featuring Adewale Ayuba

Fuji Satisfaction: Soundclash In Lagos

Studio album by BANTU featuring Adewale Ayuba
- Released: 20 June 2005
- Recorded: April–December 2014
- Studio: Herb V's Studio Cologne, Germany, Ambo Studio Berlin, Germany, Lovelite Studio Berlin, Germany, Sonny Okosun Studios Lagos, Nigeria
- Genre: Afrobeat, fuji music, hip hop, dancehall, Afrofunk
- Length: 50:02
- Label: Piranha Music
- Producer: Herb V, Ade Bantu, Afrobeat Academy Band

BANTU featuring Adewale Ayuba chronology
Bantu (album) (2004)	Fuji Satisfaction: Soundclash In Lagos (2005)	No Man Stands Alone (2010)

Singles from Fuji satisfaction
- 1. "Where Di Water, Where Di Lighter" Released: 2009

Fuji Satisfaction: Soundclash In Lagos is a studio album by BANTU. The album features vocal contributions by Nigerian Fuji musician Adewale Ayuba. It was recorded between April and December 2004 at various studios in Cologne, Berlin and Lagos, Nigeria. The album was released in June 2005 by Piranha Music. Producer Herb V produced the album by combining programmed beats and samples with Yoruba percussion instruments like the Sakara, Apala, Omele, Bata and Iya Ilu drums, Additional production and instrumentation was provided by the Berlin-based Afrobeat Academy Band. The Subject matter on Fuji Satisfaction deals with Pan Africanism, homophobia and Yoruba identity. The album marked a turning point for BANTU as it took them closer to their Yoruba roots. It also stretched conventional perception of Fuji music by fusing it with Hiphop, Dancehall, Afrobeat and Afrofunk elements. The album debuted at number 2 on the European World Music Charts. BANTU was awarded the Kora Awards (the Pan African equivalent of the Grammies) in the categories "Best Group West Africa" and "Best Group Africa" for Fuji Satisfaction

== Recording and production ==
BANTU and Adewale Ayuba first met in Cologne, Germany while Ayuba was touring Europe citing a mutual admiration for each other's music they decided to record a two track demo with Herb V. The songs "Fuji Satisfaction" and "Mama" where shopped around and the band eventually landed a recording deal with Berlin-based independent label Piranha Records. Further recording was then arranged to be done in the summer of 2004 in Lagos. Armed with sound sketches and programmed beats Herb V and Ade Bantu rented Sonny Okosun's Studios in Ogba, Lagos and proceeded to record members of Ayuba's percussion ensemble and Adewale Ayuba. On their return to Germany Ade Bantu engaged the services of Afrobeat Academy band and Oghene Kologbo of Fela Kuti's Africa 70 band to produce the songs "Follow Your Road Go", "How Real (can a real, real be?)", "Rise Up To The Occasion" and "Listen Attentively". Asides from Adewale Ayuba, lead vocal contributions was also provided by Blain Pawlos and Mirta Junco Wambrug. Eight of the 11 songs on the album where mixed by GB Dewa at Gompa Studios, Berlin. The song °Fuji Satisfaction° was mixed by Ricki Ojijo while "Mama" was mixed by Neil Perch of Zion Train.

== Track listing ==
1. Intro" 0:35
2. Fuji Satisfaction 3:11
3. Oya - 6:15
4. Follow Your Road Go" 4:21
5. Mt. Fuji 4:35
6. Where di water, where di lighter? 3:16
7. Mama 4:56
8. How Real (can a real, real be?) 6:14
9. Many lessons 3:51
10. Rise Up To The Occasion 4:47
11. Listen Attentively 7:54

== Musicians ==
- Ade Bantu – Lead vocals, backing vocals
- Adewale Ayuba – Lead vocals, backing vocals
- Blain Pawlos – Lead vocals, backing vocals
- Don Abi aka Abiodun – Lead vocals, backing vocals
- Mirta Junco Wambrug – Lead vocals, backing vocals
- Akeem Egunjobi – Backing vocals
- Mukaila Afolabi – Backing vocals
- Oladapo Adebayo – Backing vocals
- Teniade Olafisoye – Backing vocals
- Ben Abarbanel-Wolff – Saxophones, wood flute
- Daniel Allen – Trumpet
- Frank Schellenberger – Rhodes, Hammond
- Mandjao Fati – Bass, guitar
- Matt Hutchinson – Rhodes
- Oghene Kologbo – Guitar, drums, bass, backing vocals
- Reiner Witzel – Saxophones, flute
- Azeez Allabi – Sakara drum
- Basiru Olayori – Apala drum
- Ganiyu Olusola – Omele Apala drum
- Jelili Ayanrinde – Iya Ilu drum
- Mudasiru Ayansina – Bata drum
- Taiwo Boaji – Omele Apala
