= Abiodun =

Abiodun may refer to:

- Abiodun (Oyo ruler), ruler of the Oyo people
- Abiodun (musician) (born 1972), Nigerian-German musician
