= Fufu (album) =

Studio album by BANTU
- Released: July 1999
- Recorded: 1996–1999
- Venue: Cologne, Germany
- Studio: Hansahaus Studio, Bonn, Dope loop Studio, Cologne, Turtle Bay Hamburg, Spacesship Studio, Cologne, Ajuja Schallwellen, Cologne, Stollwerk, Cologne, Robneck Studio, Cologne
- Genre: Rap, dancehall, highlife, Afrobeat, reggae
- Length: 40:00
- Label: Kennis Music
- Producer: Abiodun, Robert Nacken, Oliver Freyman, Mathias Arfmann, Christoph Schmich, Knaller & Die Herren

BANTU chronology
Fufu (1999)	Bantu (2004)

Singles from Fufu
- 1. "Nzobu" Released: June 01, 1999; 2. "Fire Inna Dancehall" Released: October 20, 2000

Fufu is the first studio album by BANTU. The album consists of collective and individual compositions by all four founding members of the group: Patrice, Amaechi Okerenkwo, Abiodun & Ade Bantu. It was released by the Nigerian music label Kennis Music. The album earned BANTU two radio hit singles in Nigeria for the songs “Nzogbu” & “Fire Inna Dancehall”

== Recording and production ==
BANTU's first released recording was "No Vernacular (Humber Version)" featured on the Cologne Carnival compilation Humba 2-Fastlovend Roots in 1996, this was followed by yet another appearance two years later (1998) on Humba 3- The Power of Jeckness with 2 songs "Nzobu" with Brother Resistance and "Fire Inna Dancehall" with Schäl Sick Brass Band. Prompted by the death of Nigerian dictator Sani Abacha and the transition of Nigeria to democracy, some members of BANTU felt the need to engage the Nigerian public with their music. They commissioned a music video for "Nzobu" which was directed by Martin Maiburg and German video artist Marcel Odenbach. Ade Bantu, Amechi and Abiodun then travelled to Lagos, Nigeria in July 1999 to promote "Nzobu" as a single. A few weeks later it was on heavy rotation on national TV and eventually became a radio hit. Due to their song's popularity radio DJ Kenny Ogungbe offered the group a record deal on his independent label Kennis Music. Obliged to deliver a long player, the band quickly put together a 9 track album. It consisted of their three previously released tracks and a joint effort "Je Ka Bere" produced by Oliver Freyman & DJ An-Dre of Weep Not Child, alongside four solo tracks: "Wonder" by Patrice, "Forever Afrikan" by Amechi, "Propaganda" by Abiodun (a.k.a. Don Abi) and "Grooving" by Ade Bantu plus a remix of "Fire Inna Dancehall". To promote the album a video for their second album single "Fire Inna Dancehall was shot in Cologne, Germany. This song would also enjoy heavy rotation on Nigerian radio stations. The title of the album "Fufu" was chosen by BANTU to highlight their mélange of different musical forms. In Interviews when asked by journalist to define their style of music Ade Bantu had come up with the term "fufu" a popular dish across West African. The album was released on CD & cassette tape in July 1999

== Track listing ==
1. Fire Inna Dancehall
2. Nzobu
3. Wonder
4. Propaganda
5. No Vernacular
6. Forever Afrikan
7. Je Ka Bere (Millennium Version)
8. Grooving
9. Fire Inna Dancehall (Juju Clubmix)

== Personnel ==
- Ade Bantu – lead vocals, backing vocals
- Don Abi a.k.a. Abiodun – lead vocals, production, backing vocals
- Patrice – lead vocals, backing vocals
- Amaechi Okerenkwo – lead vocals, backing vocals
- Brother Resistance – guest vocals on "Nzobu"
- Schäl Sick Brass Band – horns & backing band on "Fire Inna Dancehall"
- Tunji Beier – percussion on "Nzobu" & "Fire Inna Dancehall"
- Derek Jones – steel drum on "Nzobu"
- Christoph Schmich – keyboard & programming on "No Vernacular"
- High Voltage Band – backing band on "Propaganda"
- Boysie White – backing vocals on "Forever African"
- Knaller & Die Herren – production on "Grooving"
- Bernd Keul – programming & Bass on "Nzobu"
- Mandjao Fati – guitar on "Nzobu" & "No Vernacular"
- Carlos Robalo – backing vocals on "Nzobu"
- Oussegnou – backing vocals on "Nzobu"
- Mätes B – programming
- Oliver Finken – programming on "Je Ka Bere (Millennium Version)"
- Mathias Wilkes – programming
