= Bantu (band) =

Nigerian band

BANTU
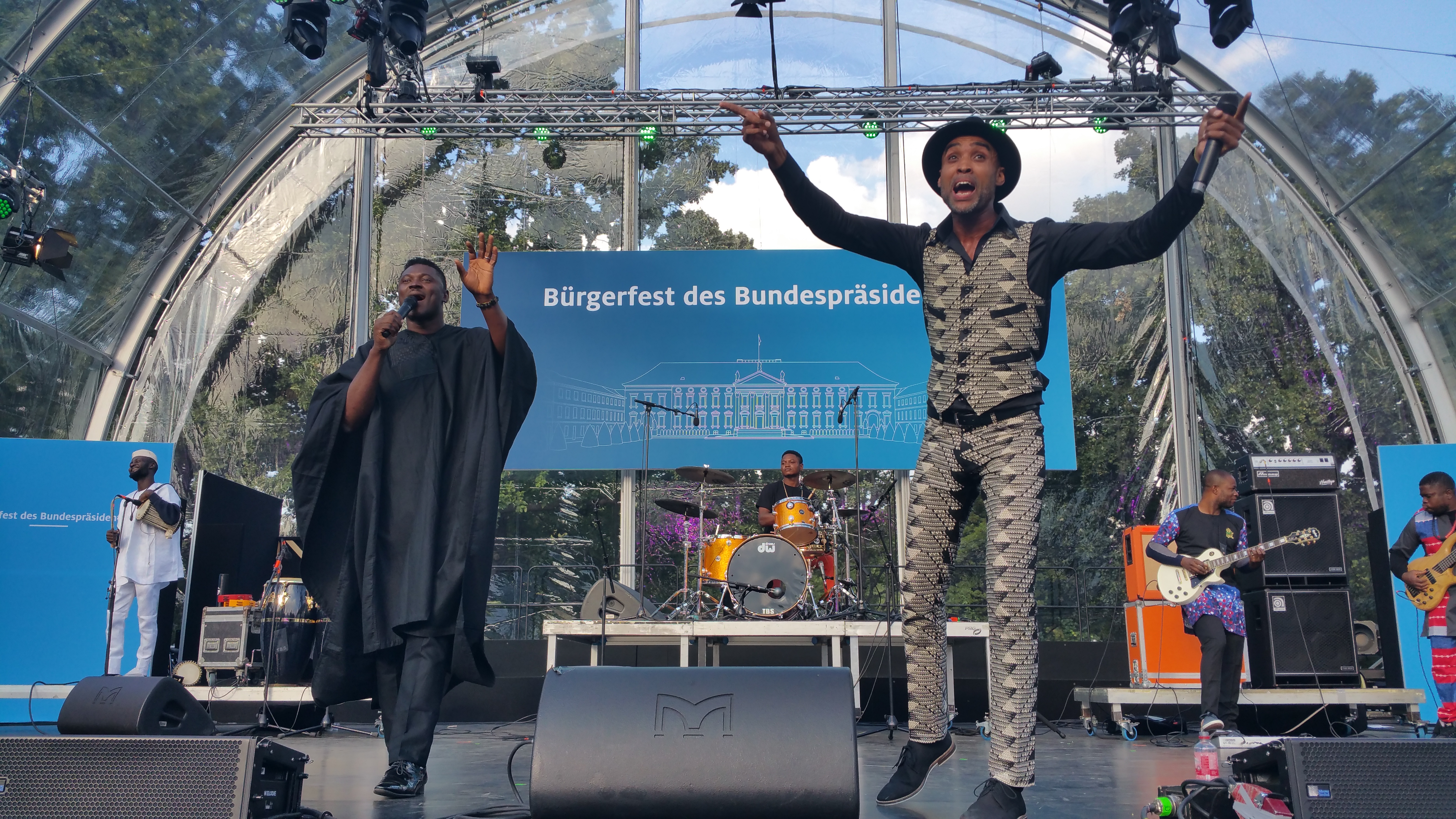

Background information
- Also known as: Bantucrew, B.A.N.T.U. or Brotherhood Alliance Navigating Towards Unity
- Origin: Lagos, Nigeria
- Genres: Afrofunk, Afrobeat, hip hop, highlife
- Years active: 1996–present
- Label: Soledad Productions
- Website: www.bantucrew.com

Bantu (stylised in all caps) is a 13-piece band based in Lagos, Nigeria. Their music is a fusion of Afrofunk, Afrobeat, highlife and Yoruba music. The group features multi-instrumentalists and singers who perform as a collective.

== History ==
Nigerian-German brothers Ade Bantu and Abiodun, Sierra Leonean-German-singer Patrice and Nigerian singer Amaechi Okerenkwo founded Bantu in 1996 in Cologne, Germany. BANTU is an acronym for "Brotherhood Alliance Navigating Towards Unity" and according to band member Ade Bantu the name was also chosen to honour South African anti-apartheid activist Steve Bantu Biko.

The band's first recording was "No Vernacular (Humber Version)" which they released on the Cologne Carnival compilation Humba 2-Fastlovend Roots in 1996. Their debut album Fufu was released in 2000 and it became an instant success in Nigeria earning them two radio hit singles: "Nzogbu" (featuring Trinidadian Rapso artist Brother Resistance) and "Fire Inna Dancehall". After the departure of Amaechi and Patrice from the band a second self-titled album Bantu featuring Jamaican drummer Sly Dunbar, Peter Tosh guitarist Earl "Chinna" Smith, Positive Black Soul and Pee Froiss from Senegal was released in 2004 with Ade Bantu & Abiodun handling most of the vocal duties. In 2005 Bantu was awarded the Kora Awards (the Pan African equivalent of the Grammies) in the categories "Best Group West Africa" and "Best Group Africa" for their third album release Fuji Satisfaction a collaborative effort that featured Nigerian Fuji music singer Adewale Ayuba. In 2011 Bantu released their fourth studio album titled No Man Stands Alone an album of collaborations mostly recorded in Nigeria. The album featured Highlife music legend Fatai Rolling Dollar, Nigerian singer Sound Sultan and Nigerian-German singer Nneka amongst many others.

Since 2013, the Bantu collective has been hosting Afropolitan Vibes a monthly live music concert series and annual music festival in Lagos, Nigeria. On 7 July 2017, the 13-piece Bantu collective released Agberos International. The 10 track album was produced by Aman Junaid. It features Tony Allen on drums ("Niger Delta Blues") and Nigerian spoken word poet Wana Wana ("Oni Temi"). The music on the album straddles Afrobeat, highlife, funk and hip hop, while the lyrics have been described as witty, political and satirical. In September 2020 Bantu released Everybody Get Agenda, an album which has been noted to comment not only on the socio political atmosphere in Nigeria but on the entire African continent while addressing issues of urban alienation, xenophobia and migration. The album also features Seun Kuti on the song "Yeye Theory".

Bantu released their seventh studio album, What Is Your Breaking Point?, in June 2023. The album featured a unique fusion of Afrobeat, Afrofunk and various Yourba musical influences. It also explored themes of post-colonial trauma, Africa's brain drain, gender oppression and social class discrimination.

== Collaborations ==
Bantu's broad musical scope has led to an extensive list of collaborations across all genres of music. They have recorded with the likes of British reggae group UB40, German reggae artist Gentleman, Afrobeat co-founder Tony Allen, jùjú musician Ebenezer Obey, jùjú artist Dele Ojo, highlife singer Paulson Kalu, Orlando Julius, Nigerian actor and folk singer Jimi Solanke, African China, Lord of Ajasa, Schäl Sick Brass Band, German rapper Megaloh, Afrobeat Academy Band, Ghanaian duo Fokn Bois, Ancient Astronauts and African-American rapper Akua Naru.

== Afrobeat meets Classical ==
In September 2025, BANTU participated in the Campus Project, organized by Deutsche Welle and Beethovenfest. The 2025 edition focused on Nigeria as partner country, bringing together the National Youth Orchestra of Germany and Nigerian classical musicians under the artistic direction of Ade Bantu. The joint performances took place on 11 September 2025 in Bonn (University Aula) and on 12 September 2025 at the Humboldt Forum in Berlin. The Berlin concert programme, billed as Campus-Concert: Nigeria, included works by Ludwig van Beethoven (Egmont overture, arranged by Josef Bach and Tobias Wagner), arranged songs by BANTU (Ten Times Backwards / Cash and Carry / We No Go Gree), a Yoruba traditional (Ọmọ tó mọ́ íyà rẹ̀ lójú), a German traditional (Die Gedanken sind frei), selections from Fela Sowande’s African Suite (Nostalgia and Akinla), Fela Kuti’s Colonial Mentality, the world premiere of odò (“river”) by British-Nigerian composer Cassie Kinoshi, and further BANTU works (Yeye Theory and Disrupt The Programme) arranged by Isaiah Oladele. Deutsche Welle also covered the collaboration in its Arts Unveiled series.

== Awards and nominations ==
In 2005, Bantu won the Kora Awards for "Best Group West Africa" and "Best Group Africa" for their album Fuji Satisfaction- Soundclash in Lagos.

Bantu's single "Where Di Water" was nominated for the 2009 Channel O Music Video Awards in the category "Best Ragga Dancehall Video.

"Lagos Barbie", the lead single off Bantu's Agberos International album, was nominated in the "Best Alternative Song" category at the 2018 edition of The Headies awards in Lagos, Nigeria.

== Band members ==
- Ade Bantu (vocals)
- Damilola Williams (vocals)
- Mayowa Oshuntokun (bass)
- Tunde "Jimmy" Alabi (drums)
- Kazeem Amusa (talking drums)
- Olukorede Omirinlewo (guitar)
- Opeyemi Oyewande (trumpet)
- Akinyanmi Akinhinmola (saxophone)
- Isaiah Oladele (trombone)
- Babajide Okays (keyboards)

== Previous band members ==
- Peter Sadibo (bass)
- Dare Odede (drums)
- Olufemi Sanni (guitar)
- Akinkunmi Olagunju (talking drums)
- Ayomiku Martins (vocals)
- Ireoluwa Ayodele Allen (vocals)
- Abiodun "Wurasamba" Oke (percussions)

== Discography ==
- 1999 Fufu (Kennis Music Nigeria)
- 2004 Bantu (Nitty Gritty Music)
- 2005 Fuji Satisfaction (Piranha Rec)
- 2008 Bantu (X3M Music, Nigeria)
- 2011 No Man Stands Alone (Pako Records)
- 2017 Agberos International (Soledad Productions)
- 2020 Everybody Get Agenda (Soledad Productions)
- 2023 What Is Your Breaking Point? (Soledad Productions)
