= What Is Your Breaking Point? =

Studio album by BANTU
- Released: 9 June 2023
- Recorded: October 2022 – March 2023
- Studios: Blackstar Studio, Lagos, A.LR, Lagos, Manultec Soundlab Cologne
- Genres: Afrofunk, Afrobeat, Jazz
- Length: 43:13
- Label: Soledad Productions
- Producers: Aman Junaid & Ade Bantu

BANTU chronology
Everybody Get Agenda (2020)	What Is Your Breaking Point? (2023)

Singles from What Is Your Breaking Point?
- 1. "Wayo and Division" Released: March 24, 2023; 2. "Na Me Own My Body" Released: May 26, 2023; 3. "Your Silence" Released: June 14, 2023

What Is Your Breaking Point? is the seventh studio album by Afrobeat and Afrofunk collective BANTU released on June 9, 2023, on Soledad Productions. The album features a fusion of Afrobeat, Afrofunk and Yourba musical influences. It explores themes of Africa's brain drain, post colonial trauma, gender oppression, social and class discrimination.

== Background ==
The album was recorded over a six-month period from mid 2022 to early 2023 and marked a significant creative endeavour for the band. According to Ade Bantu the aim was to create a musical journey that seamlessly incorporates genres while inviting listeners in particular those in Nigeria, to reflect on the oppressive forces stifling individual and collective growth.

== Themes and lyrical content ==
The album's title serves as a central theme, prompting listeners in Nigeria in particular to confront the social and political conditions under which they are currently living. It asks the question: how much longer are they are willing to tolerate the status quo. The lyrics address a range of topics, from divide and rule partisan politics, corruption, religious fanaticism, female empowerment, the scramble for Africa's resources, the Nigeria's End SARS protest movement, resurgence of Coup d'etas on the African continent and the ongoing brain drain. BANTU's signature style of storytelling, impactful messaging, and intricate instrumentation, showcasing the band's musical versatility and artistic depth is evident throughout the album.

== Collaboration ==
The single track "Na Me Own My Body" a song centered on the empowerment of women features the groups two female vocalists taking on lead vocal duties. It features a collaborations with African-American rapper Akua Naru. The songs is also a direct response to Nigeria's former President Buhari's infamous quip during a visit to Germany where he remarked that his wife's place was in the kitchen and bedroom.

== Critical reception ==
What Is Your Breaking Point? received acclaim from music critics. Reviewers praised the album for its innovative blend of genres, thought provoking lyrics, and captivating studio performances. Music In Africa's Gabriel Myers Hansen wrote "The 13-piece collective's new album, a brazen 10-track manifesto not only strips back dire social circumstances that have bedevilled [insert African country] but also works as the soundtrack to an impending revolution" The German Music Critics Award (Preis der deutschen Schallplattenkritik) nominated "What Is Your Breaking Point" in its 2023 "Best of Lists" in the category "World Music"

== Chart performance ==
What Is Your Breaking Point? peaked at the number 5 spot on the Trans Global World Music Chart in August 2023. and the number 11 spot on the Europe World Music Chart (Aug 2023).

== Track listing ==
What Is Your Breaking Point? track listing
No.	Title	Writer(s)	Length
1.	"Wayo and Division"	Babajide Okegbenro, Mayowa Osuntokun, Olukorede Omirinlewo, Adegoke Odukoya, Abiodun Oke, Ayomiku Aigbokhan, Tunde Alabi, Opeyemi Oyewande, Isaiah Odeyale, Akinyanmi Akinhinmola, Akinkunmi Olagunju.	3:52
2.	"Japa Japa"	Babajide Okegbenro, Mayowa Osuntokun, Olukorede Omirinlewo, Adegoke Odukoya, Abiodun Oke, Ayomiku Aigbokhan, Tunde Alabi, Opeyemi Oyewande, Isaiah Odeyale, Akinyanmi Akinhinmola, Kazeem Amusa, Damilola Williams, Abigail Ireoluwa Allen.	4:50
3.	"Ten Times Backwards"	Babajide Okegbenro, Mayowa Osuntokun, Olukorede Omirinlewo, Adegoke Odukoya, Abiodun Oke, Ayomiku Aigbokhan, Tunde Alabi, Opeyemi Oyewande, Isaiah Odeyale, Akinyanmi Akinhinmola, Kazeem Amusa, Damilola Williams, Abigail Ireoluwa Allen.	5:36
4.	"Worm & Grass"	Babajide Okegbenro, Mayowa Osuntokun, Olukorede Omirinlewo, Adegoke Odukoya, Abiodun Oke, Tunde Alabi, Opeyemi Oyewande, Isaiah Odeyale, Akinyanmi Akinhinmola, Kazeem Amusa, Damilola Williams, Abigail Ireoluwa Allen.	3:45
5.	"Borrow Borrow"	Babajide Okegbenro, Mayowa Osuntokun, Olukorede Omirinlewo, Adegoke Odukoya, Abiodun Oke, Ayomiku Aigbokhan, Tunde Alabi, Opeyemi Oyewande, Isaiah Odeyale, Akinyanmi Akinhinmola, Akinkunmi Olagunju, Damilola Williams, Abigail Ireoluwa Allen.	4:20
6.	"Africa for Sale"	Babajide Okegbenro, Mayowa Osuntokun, Olukorede Omirinlewo, Adegoke Odukoya, Abiodun Oke, Ayomiku Aigbokhan, Tunde Alabi, Opeyemi Oyewande, Isaiah Odeyale, Akinyanmi Akinhinmola, Akinkunmi Olagunju, Damilola Williams, Abigail Ireoluwa Allen.	5:18
7.	"Na Me Own My Body"	Babajide Okegbenro, Mayowa Osuntokun, Olukorede Omirinlewo, Adegoke Odukoya, Abiodun Oke, Tunde Alabi, Opeyemi Oyewande, Isaiah Odeyale, Akinyanmi Akinhinmola, Akinkunmi Olagunju, Damilola Williams, Abigail Ireoluwa Allen.	5:15
8.	"Breaking Point"	Babajide Okegbenro, Mayowa Osuntokun, Olukorede Omirinlewo, Adegoke Odukoya, Abiodun Oke, Tunde Alabi, Opeyemi Oyewande, Isaiah Odeyale, Akinyanmi Akinhinmola, Kazeem Amusa, Damilola Williams, Abigail Ireoluwa Allen.	4:17
9.	"Your Silence"	Babajide Okegbenro, Mayowa Osuntokun, Olukorede Omirinlewo, Adegoke Odukoya, Abiodun Oke,, Tunde Alabi, Opeyemi Oyewande, Isaiah Odeyale, Akinyanmi Akinhinmola, Akinkunmi Olagunju, Damilola Williams Abigail Ireoluwa Allen.	3:15
10.	"We No Go Gree" (featuring Akua Naru)	Babajide Okegbenro, Mayowa Osuntokun, Olukorede Omirinlewo, Adegoke Odukoya, Abiodun Oke, Ayomiku Aigbokhan, Tunde Alabi, Opeyemi Oyewande, Isaiah Odeyale, Akinyanmi Akinhinmola, Akinkunmi Olagunju, Damilola Williams, Abigail Ireoluwa Allen.	4:45
Total length:			43:13

== Personnel ==
- Ade Bantu ead vocals (1, 2, 3, 5, 6, 8, 9,10)
- Ayomiku "Mide The Music Man" Aigbokhan – lead vocals (track 4), backing vocals (track 1–6, 8–10)
- Abigail Ireoluwa Allen – lead vocals (track 7), background vocals (track 1–10)
- Damilola "Didi Willz" Williams – lead vocals (track 7), background vocals (track 1–10)
- Mayowa Oshuntokun – bass (track 1–10)
- Babajide Okegbenro – keys (track 1–10)
- Olukorede Omirinlewo – guitar (track 1–10)
- Tunde “Jimmy” Alabi – drums (track 1–10)
- Abiodun "Wurasamba" Oke – percussion (track 1–10)
- Akinkunmi Olagunju – talking drums (track 1,5,6,7,9,10)
- Kazeem Amusa – talking drums (track 2,3,4,8 )
- Opeyemi Oyewande – all horn arrangements & trumpet (track 1–10)
- Isaiah Odeyale – trombone (track 1–10)
- Akinyanmi Akinhinmola – saxophone (track 1–10)
- Akua Naru – lead vocals (track 7)

== Credits ==
- Composed and written by – BANTU
- Producers – Aman Junaid & Ade Bantu
- Recording engineers – Aman Junaid, Oluremi Iyilade
- Mixing engineer – Manu Schlindwein
- Mastering – Tony Dawsey
- Executive Producer – Ade Bantu
- Album Photography – Victor Adewale
- Layout and album design – Graeme Arendse
- Art direction – Andy Okoroafor
