= Foo-foo =

Foo-foo may refer to:

- Foo-Foo, a fictional poodle belonging to Miss Piggy on The Muppet Show
- Foo Foo, a fictional poodle belonging to Walter the Softy in the Beano
- "Foo Foo", a song by Santana from their album Shaman
- Foo-foo band, a nautical term meaning an impromptu musical band on a ship
- Foo Foo, a television animation series by Halas and Batchelor Cartoon Films, 1959-1960

== See also ==
- Foo Foo Lammar, a British drag queen and nightclub owner
- "Little Bunny Foo Foo", a children's poem
- Fufu (disambiguation)
