= Bantu (album) =

BANTU

Studio album by BANTU
- Released: 27 September 2004
- Recorded: February 2001 – September 2003
- Studios: Prech's Place Cologne, MM Studio Cologne, 2EMI Studios Paris, Nucalamani Studios Cologne, True Business Studios Bad Oeynhausen, 96 Degrees Studios Cologne, Tabernacle Studios Cologne
- Genres: Afrobeat, fuji music, hip hop, dancehall, Afrofunk
- Length: 49:24
- Label: Nitty Gritty Music
- Producers: Don Abi, Ade Bantu, Rob Nuca, Pionear, Mbegane N'dour

BANTU chronology
Fufu (2001)	BANTU (2004)	Fuji Satisfaction (2005)

Singles from BANTU

BANTU is a self titled international debut studio album by BANTU. It was released in 2004 on Nitty Gritty Music. The album features Adé Bantu and his brother Don Abi aka Abiodun sharing lead vocal duties on all songs. The subject matter of the album centers around Pan Africanism, racism, xenophobia, love and a strong yearning for home. Most of the lyrics on BANTU are in English. A few choruses are sung in Yoruba while Pidgin English is interspersed to create a distinct Nigerian flavor. Other languages sung or rapped in by guest vocalists include Wolof, Spanish, Swahili and German. The album BANTU also features a remake of the Third World 1983 classic "Lagos Jump". The album was described by music critic Karsten Frehe as a colourful mix of Afrobeat, Pop, a little Reggae, Funk, Soul & Hip Hop

== Recording and production ==
The album BANTU was recorded over a two-year period with various producers based in Germany (the only exception being "Omowale" which was produced by Mbegane N'dour in Paris). Production duties where handled by Rub Nuca ("ile"), Beatschmieda ("Lagos Jump", "One Vibe One Flow pt.2"), Trulaikes ("Watchout", "Blood A Go Run"), Pionear ("Temperature's Boiling") and BANTU band member Don Abi ("Dance To My Boogie", "No More No Vernacular", "How Many MC's", "Me, You & The Moonlight"). The production style of the album is a combination of programmed beats, samples and live instruments played by studio musicians notably amongst them are Jamaican drummer Sly Dunbar and Peter Tosh guitarist Earl "Chinna" Smith who both feature on the song "Omowale". Guests vocalists include African Rap pioneers Positive Black Soul and Pee Froiss from Senegal on "One Vibe One Flow Pt.2", Sami Sosa who raps in German on "How Many MC's", Kenyan-Rwandan sisters Sonia & Priti Kaitesi handling lead or chorus duties on ("No More No Vernacular", "Blood A Go Run", "Temperature's Boiling" & "Me, You & The Moonlight") and Cuban singer Mirta Junco Wambrug ("Add Subtract"). The album Introduced "The Sound Of Fufu" a term coined by Adé Bantu to classify BANTU's genre of music which is a combination of Hiphop, Dancehall and Afrofunk elements

== Track listing ==
1. Lagos Jump 3:29 (Clark/Cooper/Daley/Jarrett/Schloss/S.Steward/W.Steward)
2. Dance To My Boogie 3:52 (Abiodun Odukoya/Adegoke Odukoya)
3. No More No Vernacular 4:37 (Abiodun Odukoya/Adegoke Odukoya)
4. Omowale 4:09 (Abiodun Odukoya/Adegoke Odukoya)
5. Add Subtract 3:46 (Abiodun Odukoya/Adegoke Odukoya/Mirta Junco Wambrug)
6. Ilé 4:57 (Robert Nacken/Adegoke Odukoya)
7. Temperature's Boiling 4:24 (D.Kaitesi/T.Kaitesi/Leander Topp/Adegoke Odukoya)
8. One Vibe One Flow (part 2.) 4:34 (Abiodun Odukoya/Adegoke Odukoya/ Ibrahima Loucard/Didier Awadi/Beatschmieda)
9. Watchout 4:34 (Adegoke Odukoya/Nils Wenzler)
10. How Many MC's 4:05 (Abiodun Odukoya/Adegoke Odukoya/Sami Stein)
11. Blood A GO Run 4:39 (D.Kaitesi/T.Kaitesi/Abiodun Odukoya/Adegoke Odukoya)
12. Me, You & The Moonlight 4:58 (Abiodun Odukoya/Adegoke Odukoya)

== Musicians ==
Ade Bantu – Lead vocals, Backing vocals
Don Abi aka Abiodun – Lead vocals, Backing vocals
Mirta Junco Wambrug – lead vocals, Backing vocals
Daniella Sonia Kaitesi – lead vocals, Backing vocals
Tesiree Priti Kaitesi – lead vocals, Backing vocals
Sami Sosa - Rap
Positive Black Soul - Rap
Pee Froiss - Rap
Carlos Robalo - Backing vocals
Blain Paulos - Backing vocals
Reiner Witzel - Saxophone & Flute
Sebi Duwelt - Keyboards
Bernd Keul - Bass
Manougazou - Guitar
Sly Dunbar - Drums
Earl "Chinna" Smith - Guitar
Donald Dennis - Keyboards, Bass
Tunji Beier - Talking drum, Percussion
Joseph Kirschgen - Drums
Florain Beckman - Trumpet
Domee - Scratches
