= Everybody Get Agenda =

Studio album by Bantu
- Released: 23 September 2020
- Recorded: 2019–2020
- Studios: Rigmaroll Studio Lagos, Blackstar Studio, Lagos, Manultec Soundlab Cologne
- Genres: Afrofunk, Afrobeat, rap, jazz, soul
- Length: 40:37
- Label: Soledad Productions
- Producer: Aman Junaid

Bantu chronology
Agberos International (2017)	Everybody Get Agenda (2020)	What Is Your Breaking Point? (2023)

Singles from Everybody Get Agenda
- 1. "Disrupt The Programme" Released: April 10, 2020; 2. "Animal Carnival" Released: May 29, 2020; 3. "Animal Carnival (Fokn Bois Remix)" Released: August 14, 2020; 4. "Cash And Carry" Released: October 2, 2020; 5. "Cash And Carry Remix feat. Megaloh" Released: November 20, 2020

Everybody Get Agenda is the sixth studio album by Bantu, released on September 23, 2020, on Soledad Productions. Like their previous album Agberos International, this long player was composed and written by all members of the band. It was recorded in Lagos, Nigeria and mixed in Cologne, Germany. The music style is Afrofunk and Afrobeat with elements of Yoruba music, Soul, Jazz and Rap.

== Background ==
The album title is taken from the chorus line of the song "Cash And Carry" which is also featured on the album. The lyrics on "Everybody Get Agenda" center around corruption in Nigeria, the Mediterranean migration crisis, urban alienation, xenophobia, authoritarian rule and oppressive policies in Africa. Prior to the album's official release, BANTU released two singles with accompanying music videos. The first single “Disrupt The Programme” was released in April 2020. Six weeks later this was followed by an animated music video to "Animal Carnival". The release of “Everybody Get Agenda” was accompanied by a music video to “Cash And Carry”. The album features guest vocal performances by Seun Kuti on the song "Yeye Theory".

== Remixes ==
Unlike previous album projects, Bantu has released a string of remix singles from the "Everybody Get Agenda" album. The band collaborated with Ghanaian Rap duo Fokn Bois for the remix of "Animal Carnival". The song includes additional rap verses by M3NSA & Wanlov the Kubolor. German House producer Razoof provided two remixes for "Yeye Theory" and "Animal Carnival" while Ghanaian Stallion produced a remix for their song "Cash And Carry" with a guest feature by German rapper Megaloh.

== Critical reception ==
German weekly newsmagazine Stern Magazin wrote: "Afrobeat, Highlife, Funk, Jazz, Soul: the Nigerian ensemble BANTU brews an inspiring groove cocktail and doesn't skimp on political messages. A worldmusic masterpiece".Le Monde’s Fabien Mollon commented, "Composed of thirteen musicians and led by the German-Nigerian singer Adé Bantu, this collective also walks in the footsteps of the "king" of Afrobeat, whose spirit they perpetuate, both in substance and in form". Lucy Ilado of Music In Africa wrote, "Everybody Get Agenda like all previous BANTU albums is a reflection not only of the socio-political atmosphere in Nigeria but also that of the continent. This positions BANTU as one of Africa's most politically driven bands". Chinonso Ihekire of The Guardian Newspaper noted "in this latest 10-track offering from the 13-man band, BANTU vividly x-rays Nigeria’s perennial socio-political problems, in the most relatable manner; and while the album preaches that change is possible, listening to it would tell you why".

"Everybody Get Agenda" peaked at the number 3 spot on the Trans Global World Music Charts (November 2020) and the number 5 spot on the Europe World Music Chart (December 2020). It was listed on "The Best Nigerian albums of 2020" by Music In Africa (Dec 2020)

== Track listing ==
No.	Title	Writer(s)	Length
1.	"Animal Carnival"	Babajide Okegbenro, Peter Sadibo, Olufemi Sanni, Adegoke Odukoya, Abiodun Oke, Ayomiku Aigbokhan, Dare Odede, Opeyemi Oyewande, Isaiah Odeyale, Akinyanmi Akinhinmola, Akinkunmi Olagunju, Damilola Williams	3:51
2.	"Disrupt the Programme"	Babajide Okegbenro, Peter Sadibo, Olufemi Sanni, Adegoke Odukoya, Abiodun Oke, Ayomiku Aigbokhan, Dare Odede, Opeyemi Oyewande, Isaiah Odeyale, Akinyanmi Akinhinmola, Akinkunmi Olagunju	4:01
3.	"Water Cemetery"	Babajide Okegbenro, Olufemi Sanni, Peter Sadibo, Adegoke Odukoya, Tunde Alabi, Opeyemi Oyewande, Isaiah Odeyale, Akinyanmi Akinhinmola, Akinkunmi Olagunju, Abiodun Oke, Ayomiku Aigbokhan	4:22
4.	"Cash and Carry"	Olukorede Omirinlewo, Babajide Okegbenro, Peter Sadibo, Adegoke Odukoya, Tunde Alabi, Opeyemi Oyewande, Isaiah Odeyale, Akinyanmi Akinhinmola, Akinkunmi Olagunju, Abiodun Oke, Adesegun Junaid	3:53
5.	"Jagun Jagun"	Babajide Okegbenro, Laolu Ajibade, Peter Sadibo, Olufemi Sanni, Adegoke Odukoya, Abiodun Oke, Opeyemi Oyewande, Ayomiku Aigbokhan, Akinkunmi Olagunju, Ibrahim Oyetunji	3:29
6.	"Killers and Looters"	Babajide Okegbenro, Olufemi Sanni, Peter Sadibo, Adegoke Odukoya, Tunde Alabi, Abiodun Oke, Ayomiku Aigbokhan, Opeyemi Oyewande, Isaiah Odeyale, Akinyanmi Akinhinmola, Akinkunmi Olagunju	4:47
7.	"Me, Myself and I"	Babajide Okegbenro, Peter Sadibo, Olufemi Sanni, Adegoke Odukoya, Abiodun Oke, Ayomiku Aigbokhan, Dare Odede, Opeyemi Oyewande, Isaiah Odeyale, Akinyanmi Akinhinmola, Akinkunmi Olagunju, Tosin Alade	4:17
8.	"Man Know Man"	Babajide Okegbenro, Peter Sadibo, Olufemi Sanni, Adegoke Odukoya, Abiodun Oke, Ayomiku Aigbokhan, Dare Odede, Opeyemi Oyewande, Isaiah Odeyale, Akinyanmi Akinhinmola, Akinkunmi Olagunju	4:51
9.	"Big Lie"	Babajide Okegbenro, Peter Sadibo, Abiodun Oke, Adegoke Odukoya, Tunde Alabi, Olukorede Omirinlewo, Opeyemi Oyewande, Isaiah Odeyale, Akinyanmi Akinhinmola, Akinkunmi Olagunju. Ayomiku Aigbokhan	4:49
10.	"Yeye Theory" (featuring Seun Kuti)	Babajide Okegbenro, Peter Sadibo, Abiodun Oke, Adegoke Odukoya, Tunde Alabi, Olukorede Omirinlewo, Opeyemi Oyewande, Isaiah Odeyale, Akinyanmi Akinhinmola, Akinkunmi Olagunju, Seun Kuti	4:17
Total length:			40:37

== Personnel ==
- Ade Bantu – lead vocals (track 1,2,4,5,6,7,10), rap (track 3, 8)
- Ayomiku "MideTheMusicMan" Aigbokhan – lead vocals (track 9), backing vocals (track 1–10)
- Abigail Ireoluwa Allen – lead vocals (track 8), background vocals (track 1,2,4,7,8)
- Damilola "DharmiWillz" Williams – lead vocals (track 8), background vocals (track 1–10)
- Peter Sadibo – bass (track 1–10), background vocals (track 9,10)
- Babajide Okegbenro – keys (track 1–10), background vocals (track 1,9,10)
- Olufemi Sanni – guitar (track 1,2,3,6,7,8), background vocals (track 2)
- Olukorede Omirinlewo – guitar (track 4,5,9,10), background vocals (track 9,10)
- Dare Odede – drums (track 1,2,7,8)
- Tunde "Jimmy" Alabi – drums (track 3,4,5,6,9,10), background vocals (track 9,10)
- Abiodun "Wurasamba" Oke – percussion (track 1–10), background vocals (track 10)
- Akinkunmi Olagunju – talking drums (track 1–10), background vocals (track 1,10)
- Opeyemi Oyewande – all horn arrangements & trumpet (track 1–10), background vocals (track 10)
- Isaiah Odeyale – trombone (track 1–10), background vocals (track 10)
- Akinyanmi Akinhinmola – saxophone (track 1–10), background vocals (track 10)
- Seun Kuti – lead vocals (track 10)
- Ibrahim Oyetunji – ewi vocals (track 5)
- Joyce Olong – background vocals (track 4,9)
- Felicia Ogar-John – background vocals (track 9,10)
- Tosin Alade – guitar solo (track 7)
- Aman Junaid – background vocals (track 4)

== Credits ==
- Composed and written by Bantu
- Producer – Aman Junaid
- Recording engineers – Aman Junaid, Adey Omotade
- Mixing engineer – Manu Schlindwein
- Mastering – Tony Dawsey
- Executive Producer – Ade Bantu
- Photography – Uche James Iroha
- Layout and album design – Graeme Arendse
- Art direction – Andy Okoroafor
