= Muri Okunola Park =

Park in Lagos, Nigeria

Coordinates: 56.4378°N 3.4251°E

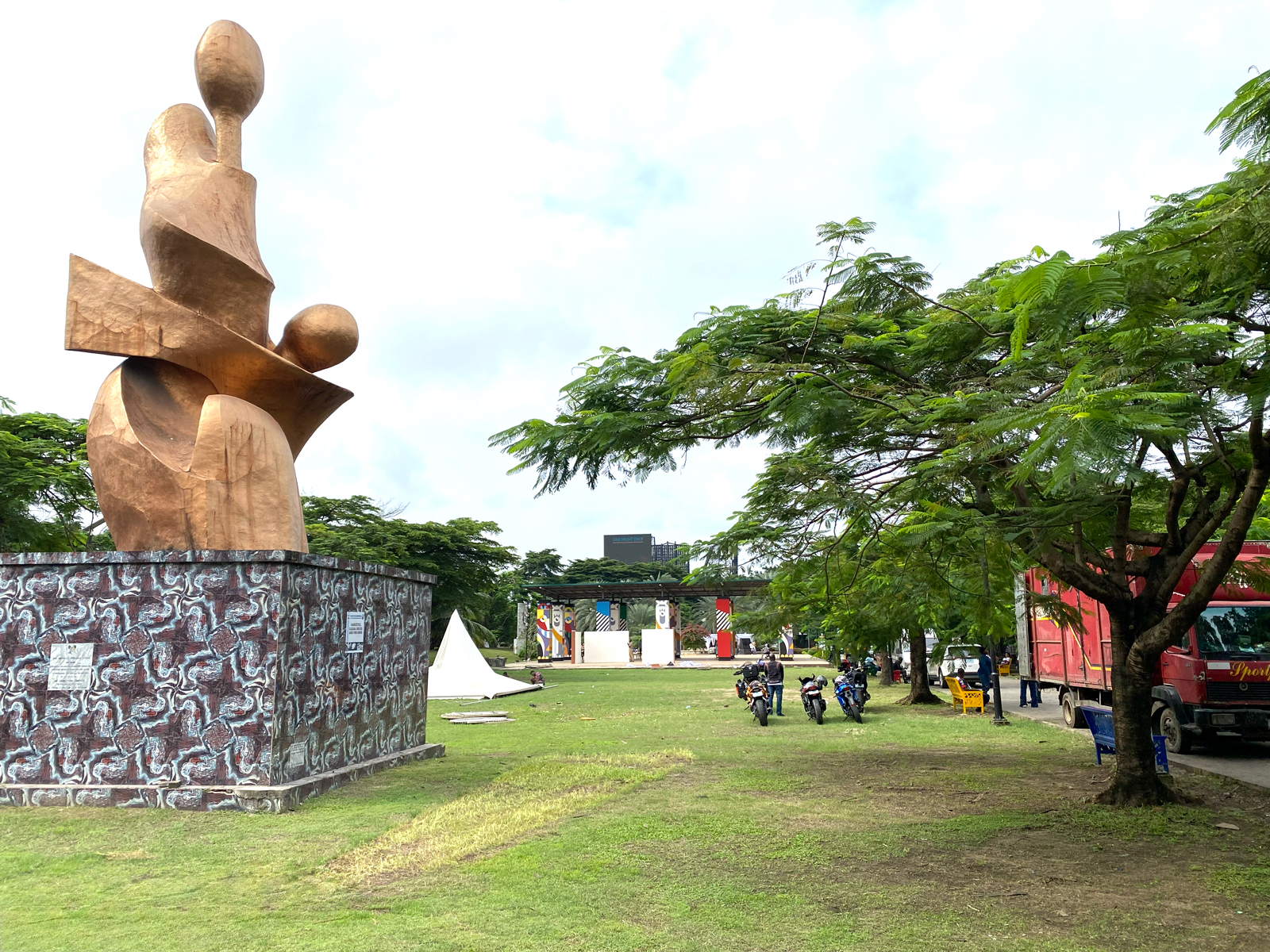
View from the South, on the eve of a Nigerian biker event

Muri Okunola Park is a green space on Victoria Island in Lagos, Nigeria. The development of this city park was part of the metropolis’s urban regeneration programme in 2008, initiated by the then Governor Fashola. Muri Okunola Park is situated near the Nigerian Law School.

== Name ==
The park was named after Judge Muritala Okunola. He had been a highly respected judge at the High Court of Lagos State since 1986 until he died suddenly in 2004 whilst on a pilgrimage to Mecca.

== Location ==
The park is situated within a road loop from the Lekki-Epe Expressway to Falomo Bridge and can therefore only be accessed via Adeyemo Alakija Street.

== Artworks ==
The park is used almost daily by photographers and content creators, who appreciate it as a backdrop. Centrally located within the park is the pavilion-like installation ‘The King’s Court’ by the artist collective Inscribe, which was unveiled in January 2026. At the entrance stands the aluminium sculpture ‘Undressed Identity’ by Dudu Emmanuel, dating from 2018. The abstract sculpture MA'MI was created by Abolore Sobayo in 2017. To the south-west, the park is dominated by the three residential towers of Eko Court, which somewhat detract from the photographic appeal.

The venue is a popular choice for wedding receptions, company anniversaries and similar events.

== Opening times ==
The park is open from Monday to Sunday, 8 am to 8 pm.

== Gallery ==
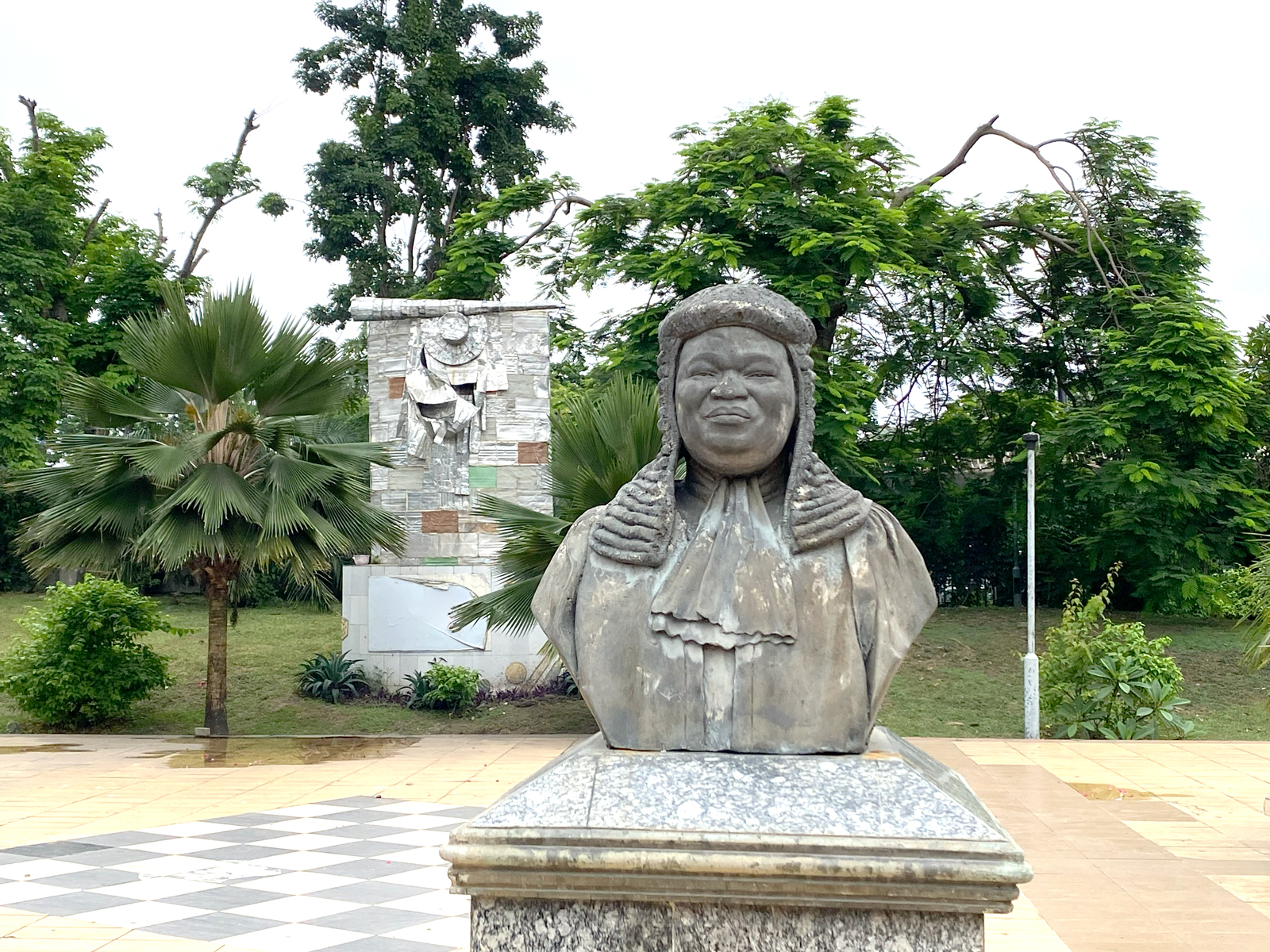
Bust of Muritala Okunola at the entrance

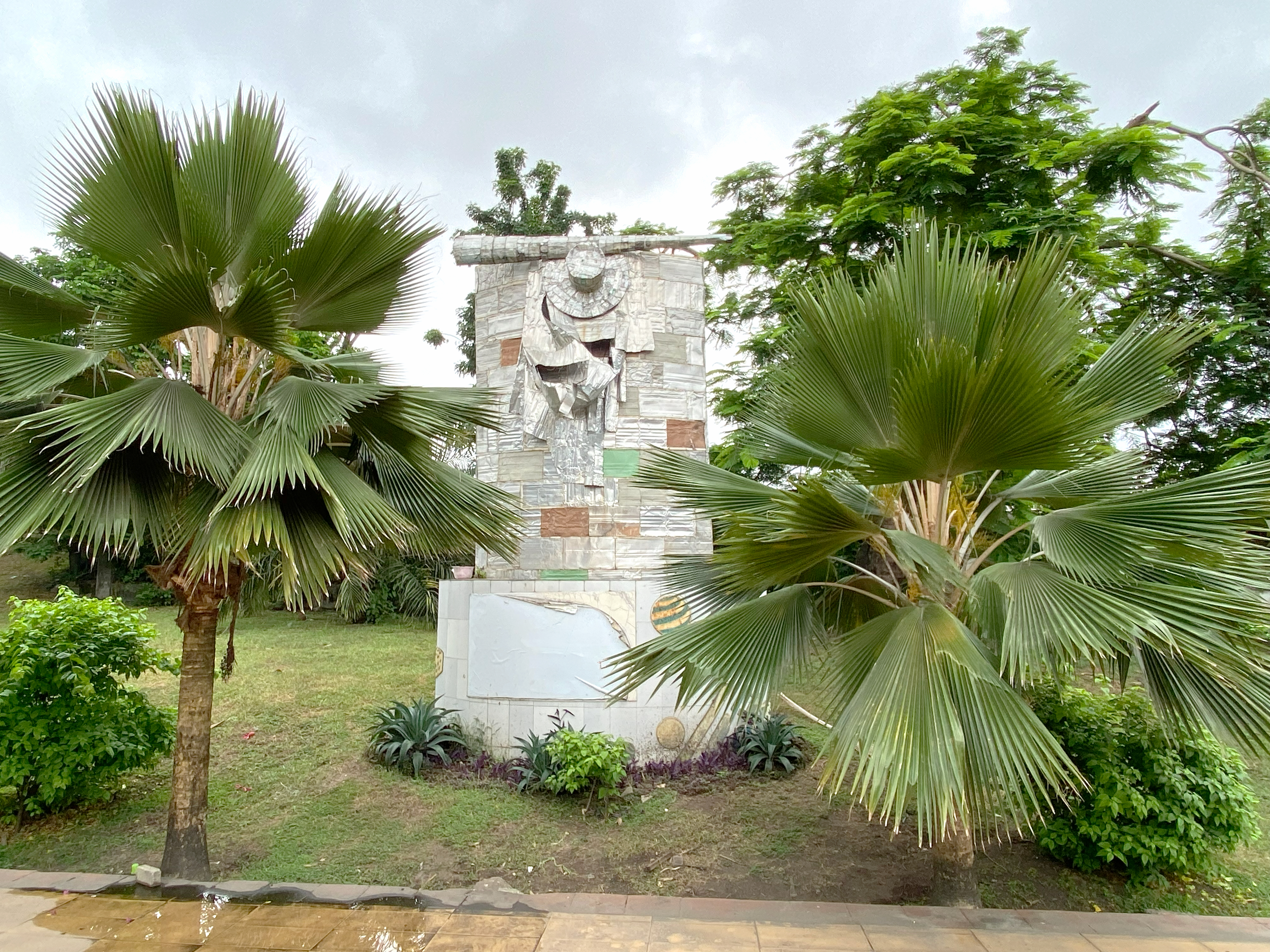
Undressed Identity by Dudu Emmanuel (2018)

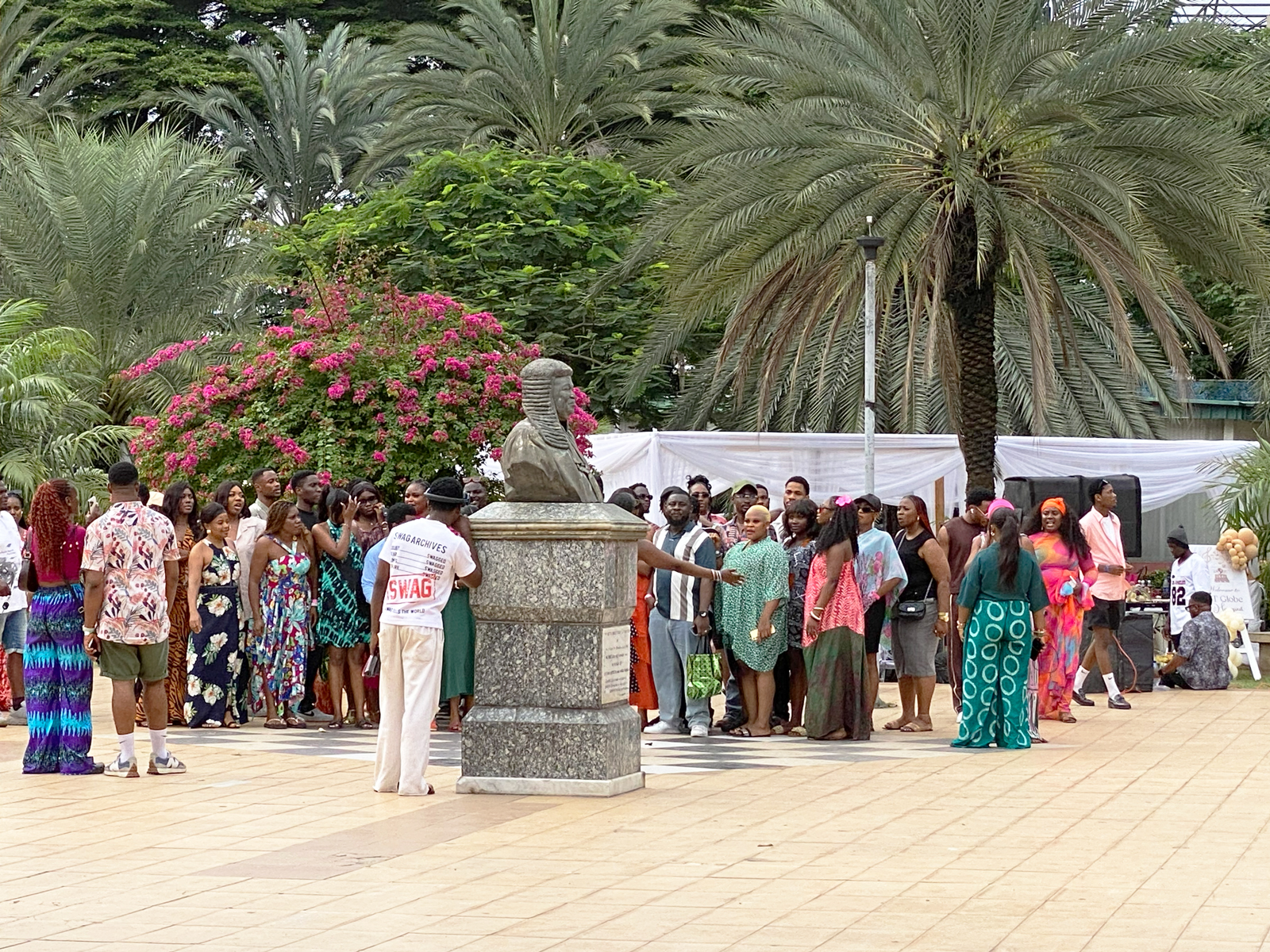
Graduation anniversary at the park

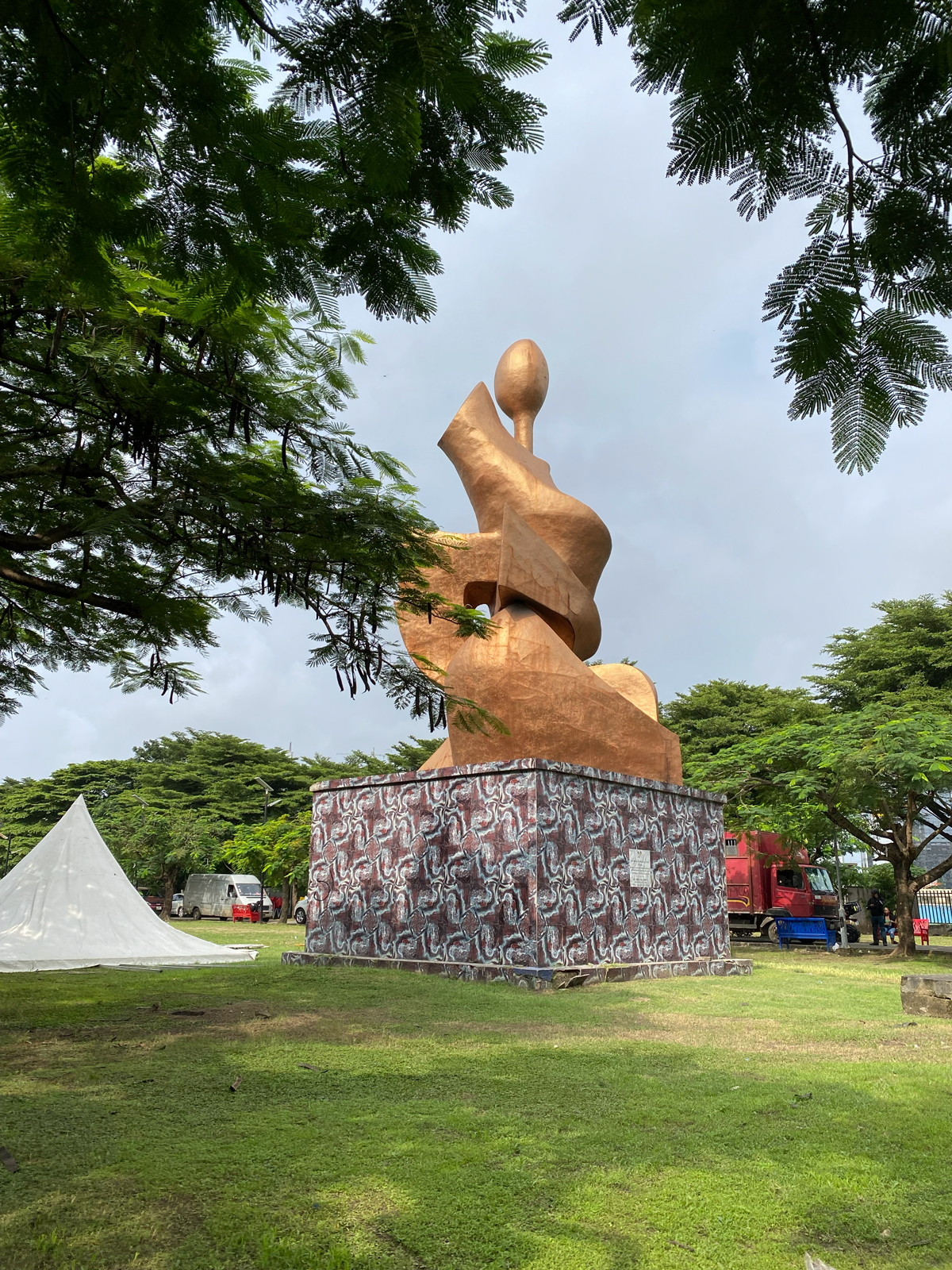
Sculpture MA´MI by Abolore Sobayo (2017)

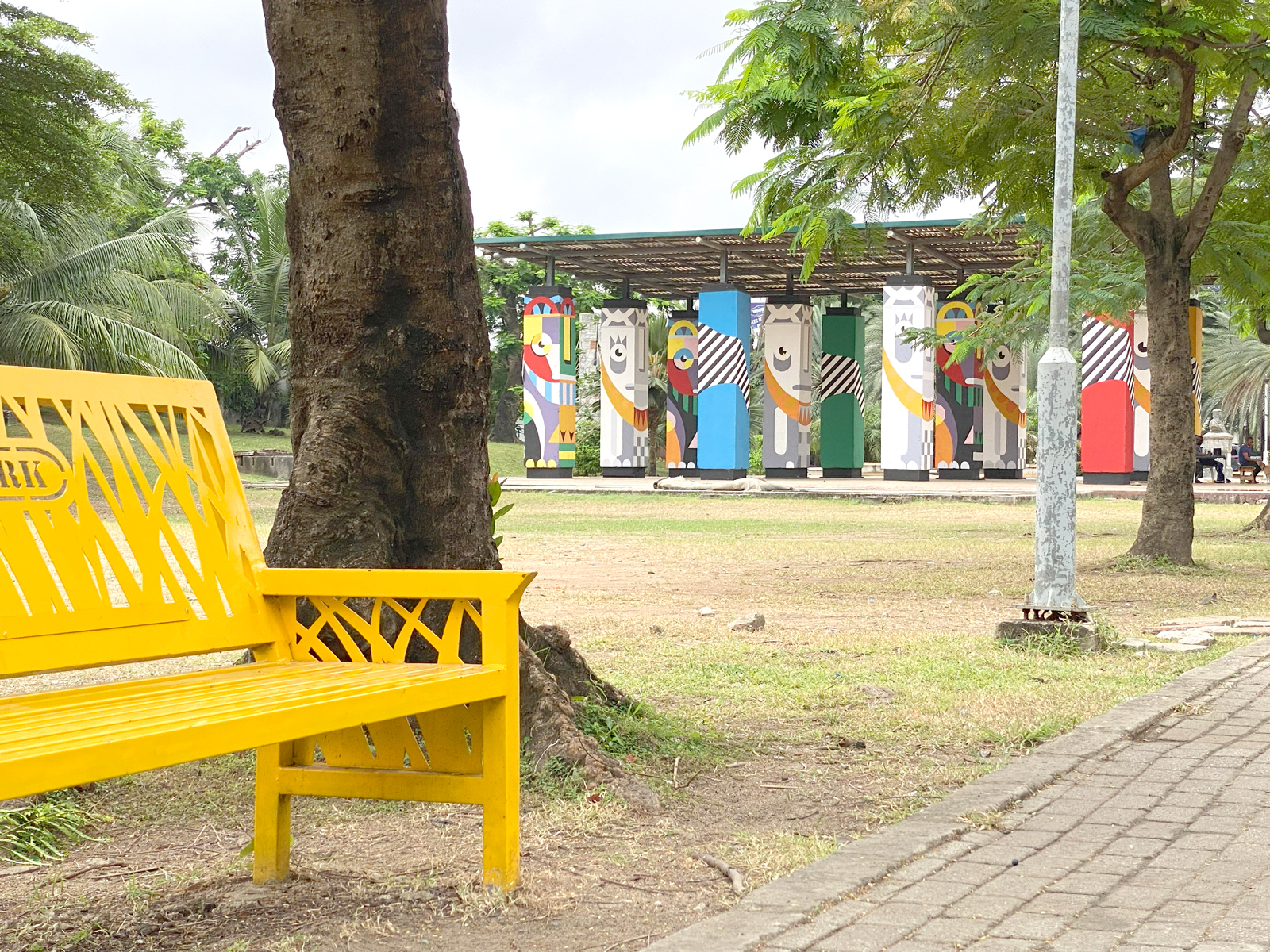
"The King's Court" by artist collective Inscribe (2026)

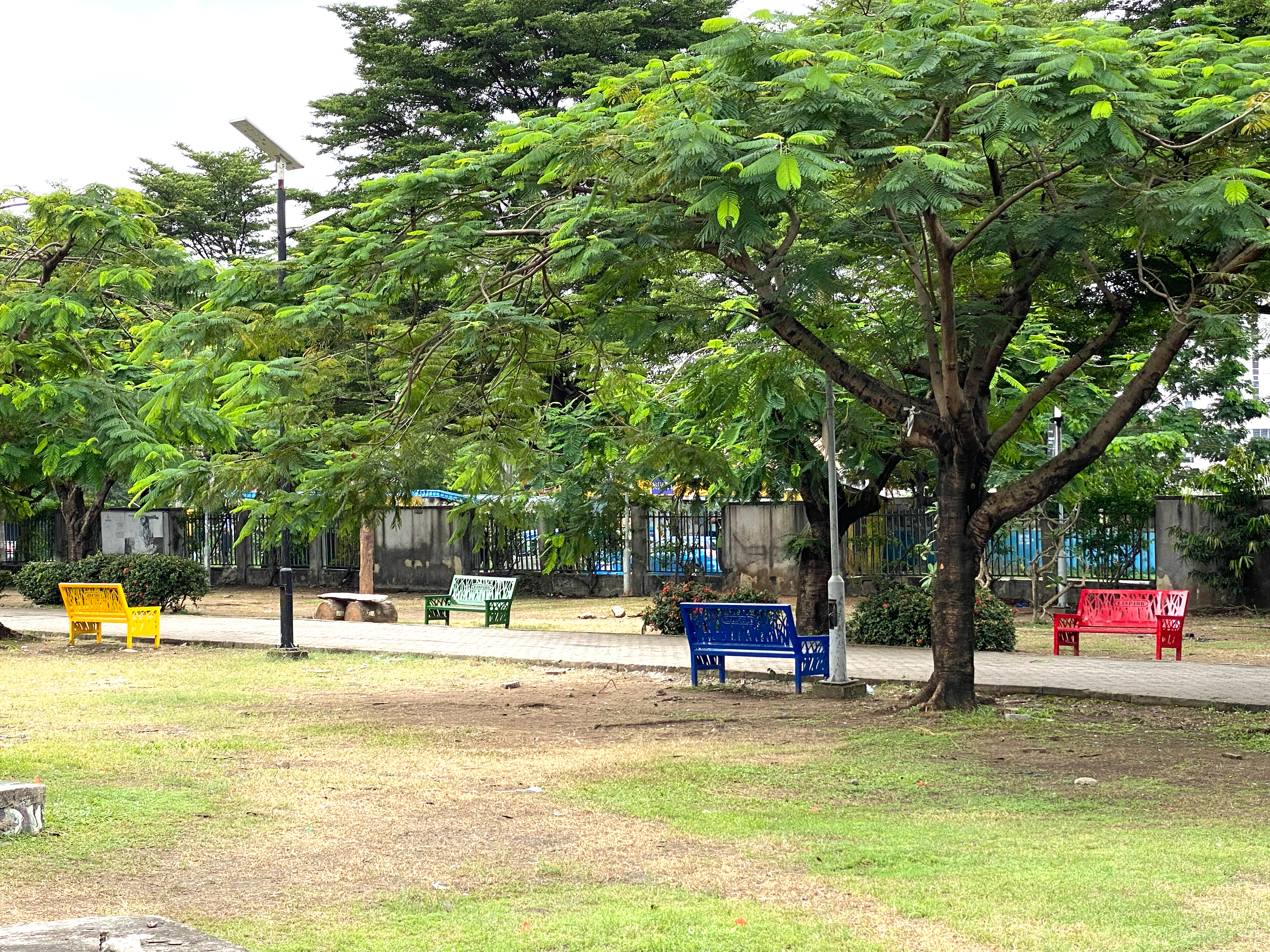
Park benches

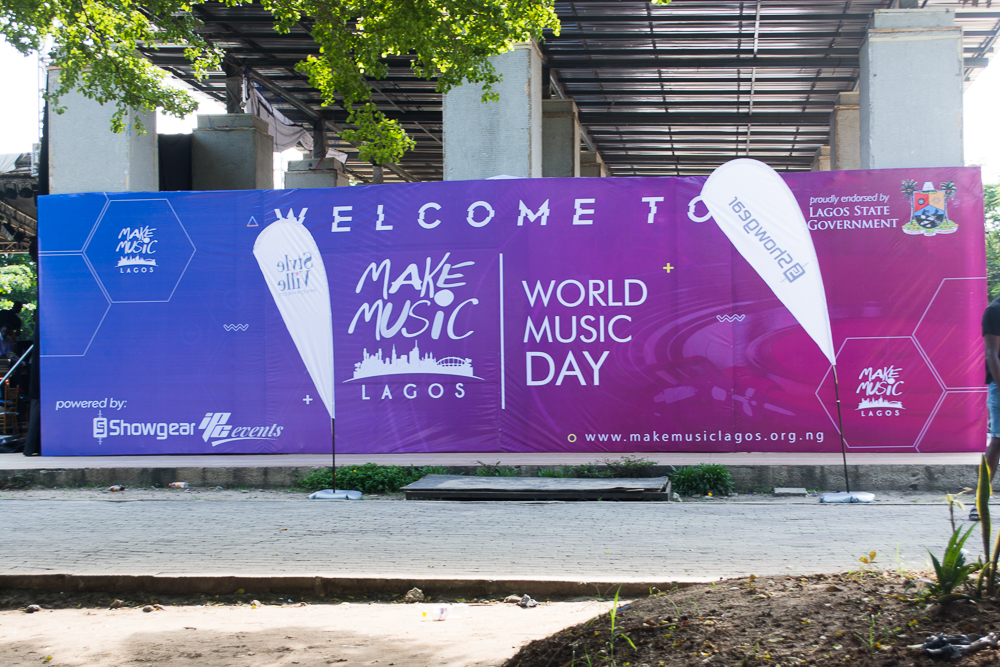
Annual World Music Day at Muri Okunola Park, here the concluding Make Music Lagos Shutdown Concert

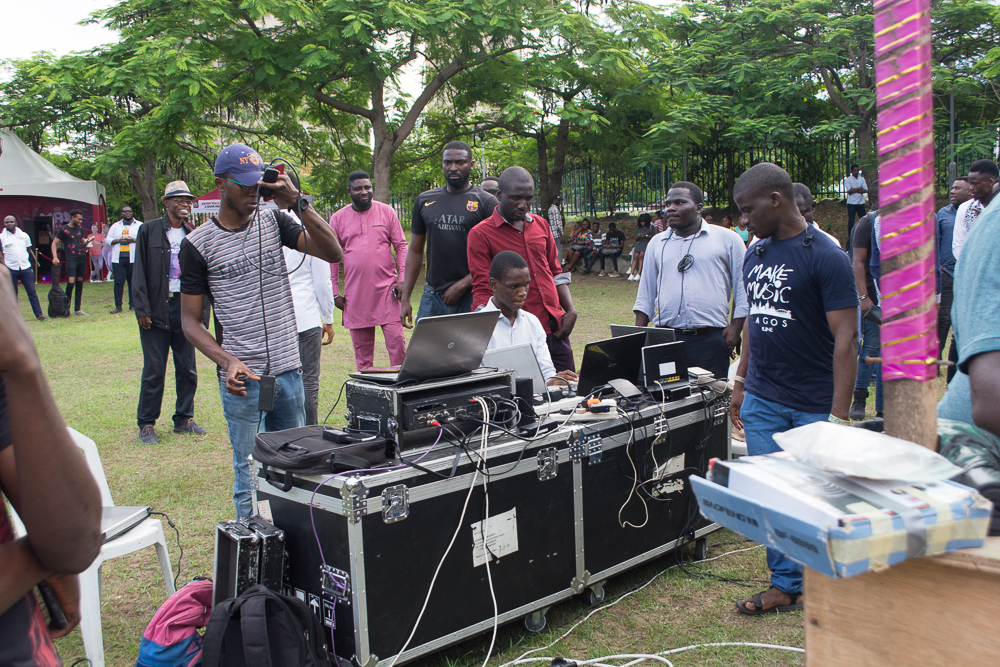
World Music Day

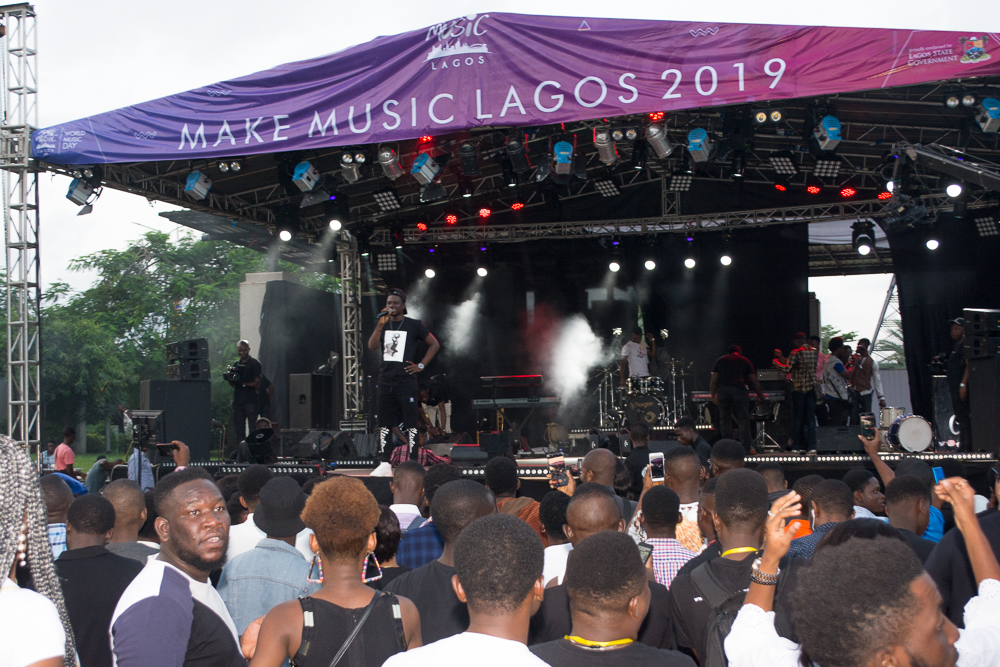
World Music Day 2019

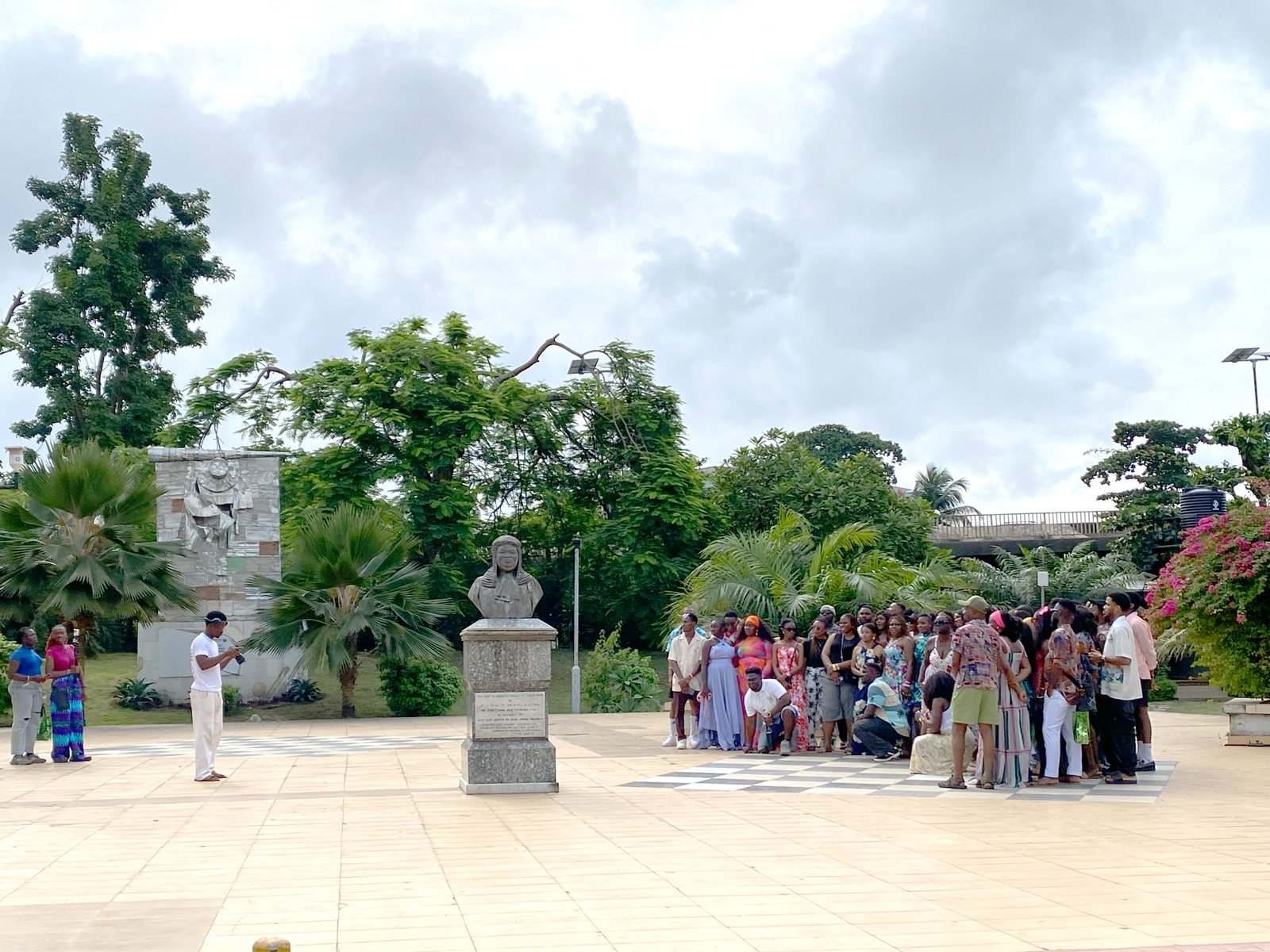
Photo shoot at the park

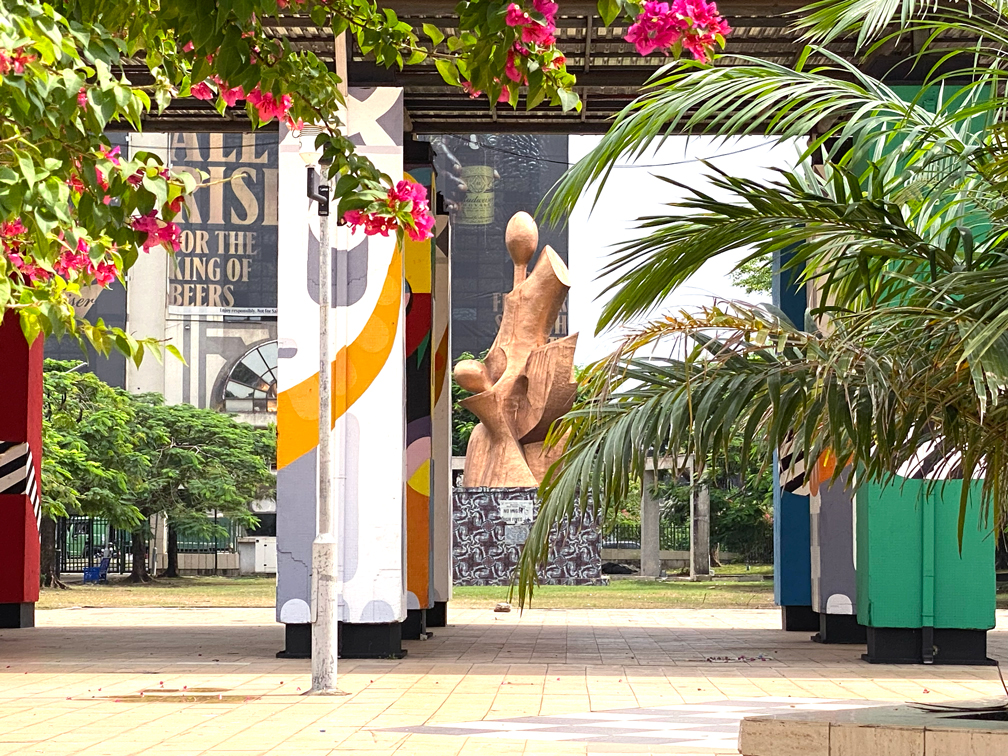
Sculpture MA´MI through the columns of the "The King's Court"

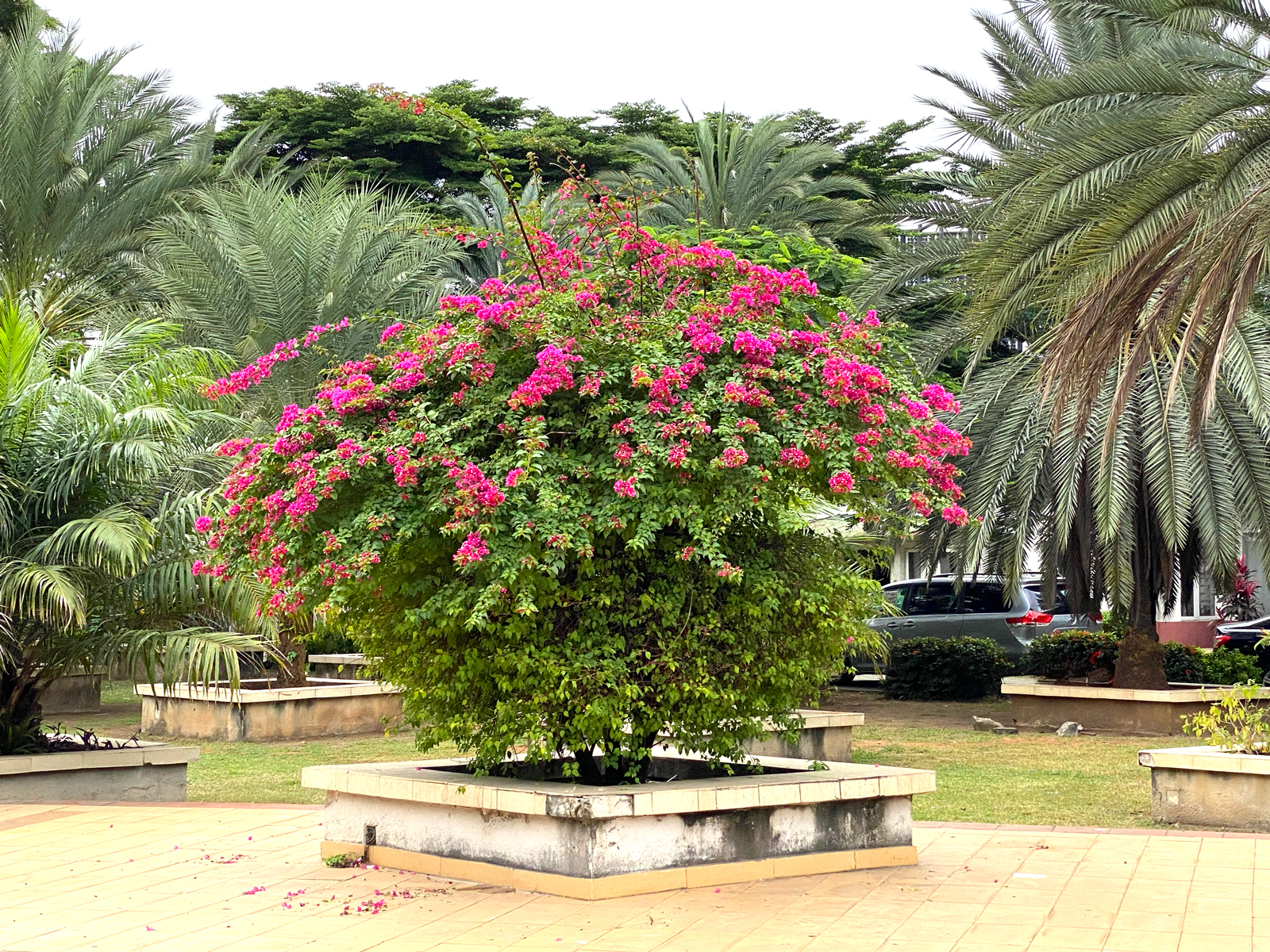
Impression of the park
