= Fufu (Tanzanian ward) =

Ward in Dodoma, Tanzania

Fufu Kata ya Fufu
- Ward
- Location within Tanzania
- Coordinates: 6.690420°S 35.9768047°E
- Country: Tanzania
- Region: Dodoma Region
- District: Dodoma Rural
- Ward: Fufu

Population (2016)
  - Total: 3,770
- Time zone: UTC+3 (EAT)

Fufu (Tanzanian ward) is an administrative ward in the Dodoma Rural district of the Dodoma Region of Tanzania. In 2016 the Tanzania National Bureau of Statistics report there were 3,770 people in the ward, from 3,469 in 2012.

== See also ==
- Dodoma Region
