= Adewale Ayuba =

Nigerian singer (born 1966)

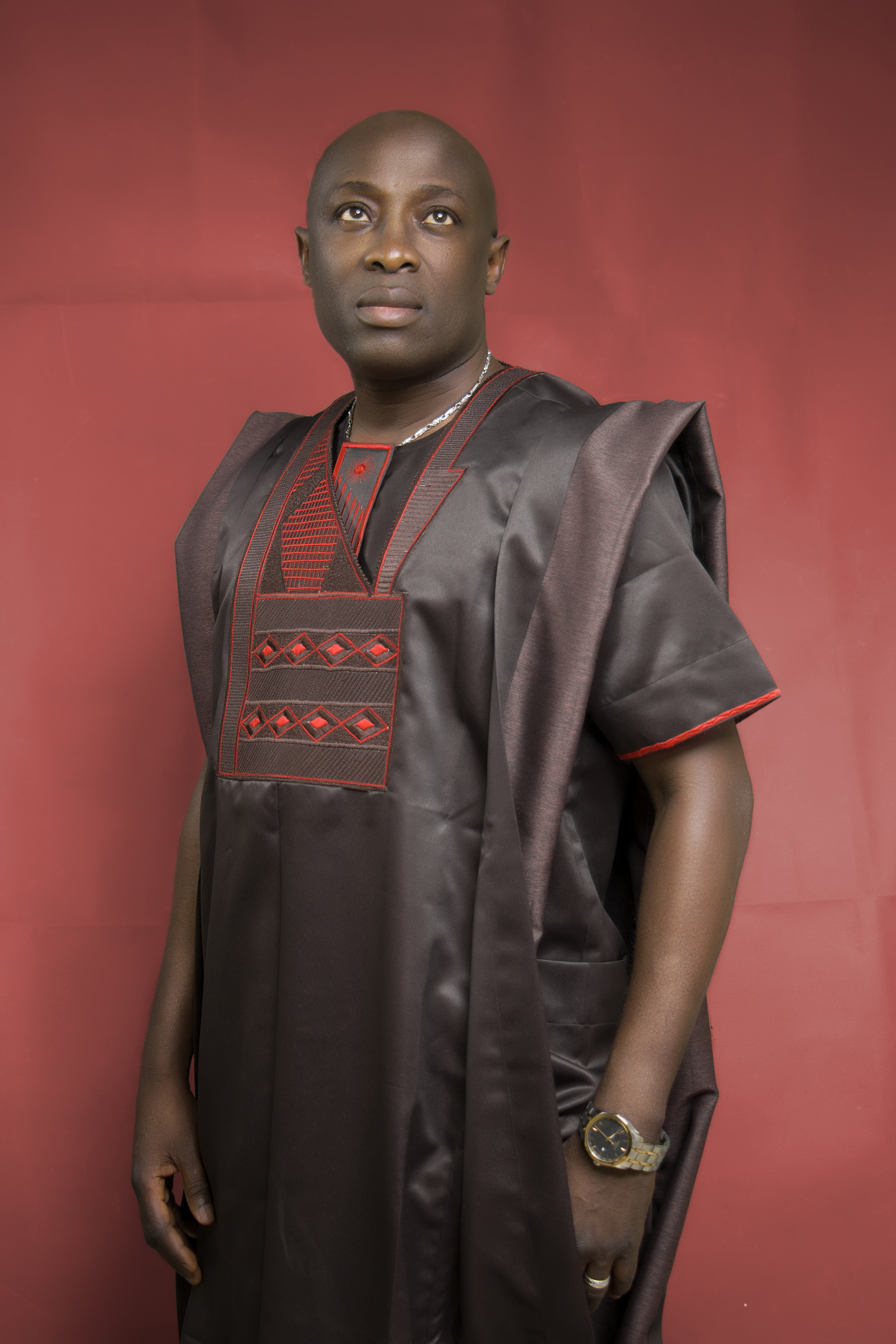
- Ayuba in 2015

Background information
- Also known as: Mr. Johnson
- Born: 6 May 1966 (age 60); Ikenne, Ogun State, Nigeria
- Genres: Fuji; World
- Occupations: Singer-songwriter, drummer, dancer, writer, artist, actor
- Years active: 1983–present

Adewale Ayuba (born 6 May 1966), professionally known as Mr. Johnson, is a Nigerian Fuji singer.

== Early life and education. ==
Ayuba was born on 6 May 1966 in Ikenne, Ogun State, Nigeria. At eight years old, he began singing at local music competitions and festivals. Ayuba attended Remo Secondary School in Sagamu, after which he started pursuing a musical career. He later enrolled in Queensborough Community College in New York, where he obtained a diploma in Financial Accounting. He subsequently obtained a Honorary Doctor of Arts degree in music from Bradley University.

== Career ==
In 1983, Ayuba released his first album, titled Ibere. In 1990, he partnered with Sony Music Nigeria, and the next year he released his second album, Bubble. The album topped music charts for six months and went on to win four awards at the Nigerian Music Awards (NMAs).

In 1993, Ayuba went on a tour of the United States, including an appearance at the New Orleans Jazz Festival. It was during this period that he was awarded the "Key to the City" of Providence, Rhode Island. In 1994, Ayuba released Bubble D through Primary Music.

In 1995, Ayuba secretly recorded an untitled album in which he advocated for the release of political prisoners incarcerated by Sani Abacha's military government, which had been in power since the 1993 Nigerian coup d'état. The album was released after Ayuba left for a three-month tour of the United States. Because of threats directed against him by the Nigerian military dictatorship following the release of the album, Ayuba would stay in the U.S. until 1998, when Sani Abacha died.

During his stay in the U.S., he would record songs and perform most prominently at the 1996 Summer Stage Concerts in New York, the Africa Mondo Concerts (1996–1997), the New Orleans Jazz Festival (1997), the International Festival in Houston (1997), and at BET's 1997 Jazz USA Concert. Ayuba later signed with the U.S.-based Q-disc Record Company, after which he released Fuji Time in 1996, followed by Fuji Dub on London's Agogo Music label in 1997.

In 1998, he released Acceleration, followed by Turn Me On in 2000, earning Best Fuji Album of the Year at the Awards for Musical Excellence in Nigeria, and he won Best Song of the Year at the Nigerian Song Festival 2000. The same year he toured England, Ireland, the Netherlands, and Belgium. In 2003, Ayuba again toured Europe again and recorded the collaborative album Fuji Satisfaction with the group BANTU; the collaboration won Best Group in West Africa and Best Group in Africa at the Kora Music Awards. He also received the Millennium Voice of Nigerian Music award from the Omo Oduduwa Association in Düsseldorf, Germany. In 2007, he released his tenth album, Mellow, which won Best Fuji Vocal Performance at the AMEN Awards and topped Nigeria's contemporary African charts.

On 25 March 2025, the President of the Federal Republic of Nigeria, Bola Tinubu, joined other well-wishers around the world to congratulate Adewale Ayuba on his 60th birthday.

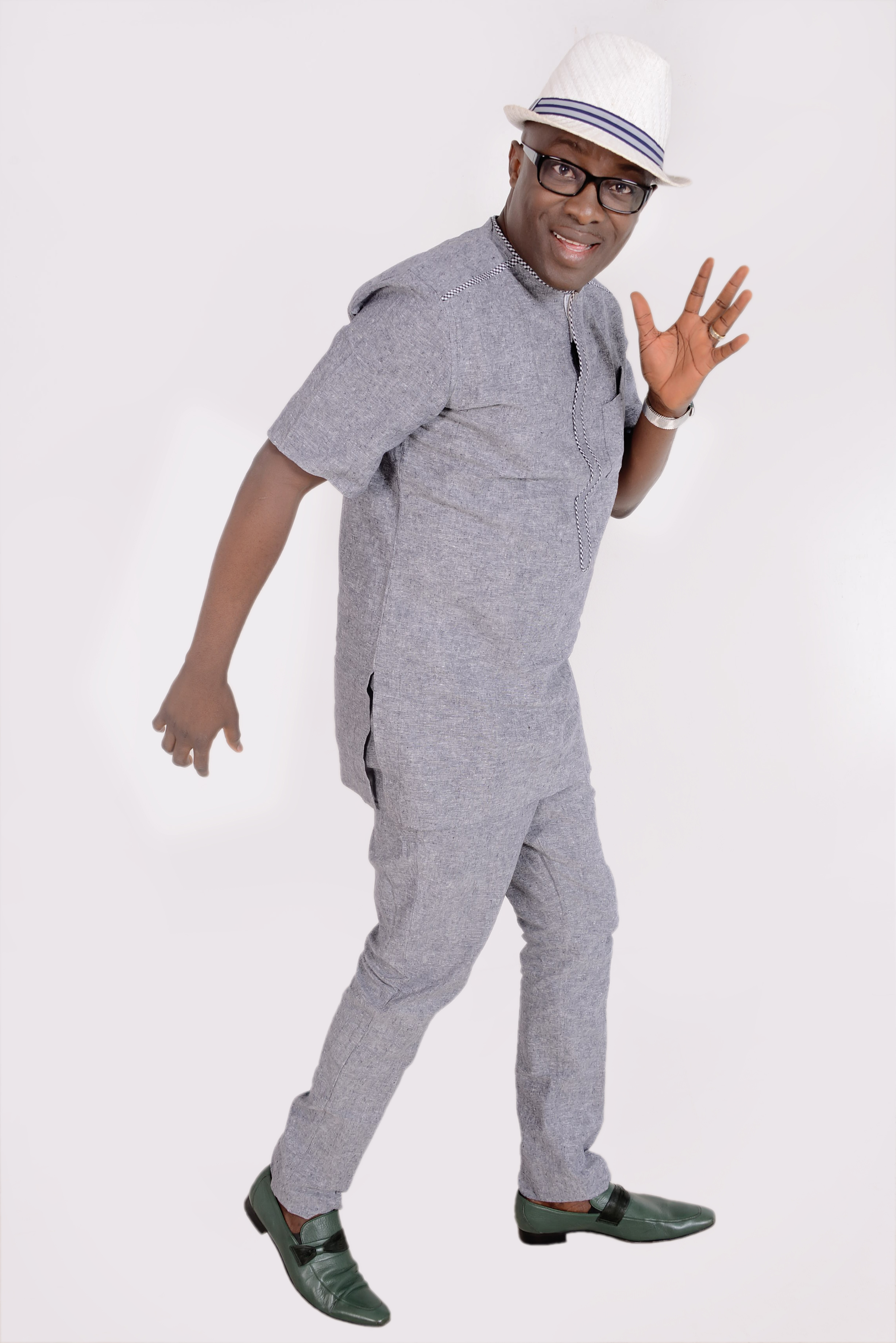
Ayuba

== Personal life ==
Ayuba is married to Azukaego Kwentoh, and they share seven children. He and Kwentoh met at Queensborough Community College in New York while studying, and the two married in 1989.

== Other ventures ==
In 2013, Ayuba enlisted his longtime stylist and fashion designer to launch Bonsue Wears. Ayuba frequently wears traditional Yoruba attire, such as the shokoto and bubba ensemble, during performances. The Bonsue Wears collection includes a two-piece design with a shirt-like top, wide sleeves, and pants that gather at the knees.

== Discography ==
=== Studio albums ===
Date	Title
1986	Ibere
1991	Bubble
1992	Mr. Johnson Play For Me
1994	Bubble D
1995	Fuji Music
1995	Move Up
1996	Fuji Time
1997	Fuji Dub Lagos-Brooklyn-Brixton
1999	Acceleration
2001	Turn Me On
2003	Gun Shot
2004	Ijo Fuji
2005	Mellow
2011	Formula
2011	Ariya
2013	Formular
2013	Sugar
2023	Fujify Your Soul
2024	Ise Oluwa

=== Singles ===
Date	Title
2023	"Koloba Koloba"
2023	"Uncommon"

== Honors and awards ==
From	Award/Honor	Date
HEN Foundation		
Kora Awards	Best Group in Africa	2005
Providence, Rhode Island	Key to the City	
Nigerian Music Awards	Artist of the Year	1993
Nigerian American Community Association, USA	Entertainer of the Year	2004
The Headies	Performer	2016
