= Akua Naru =

American rapper

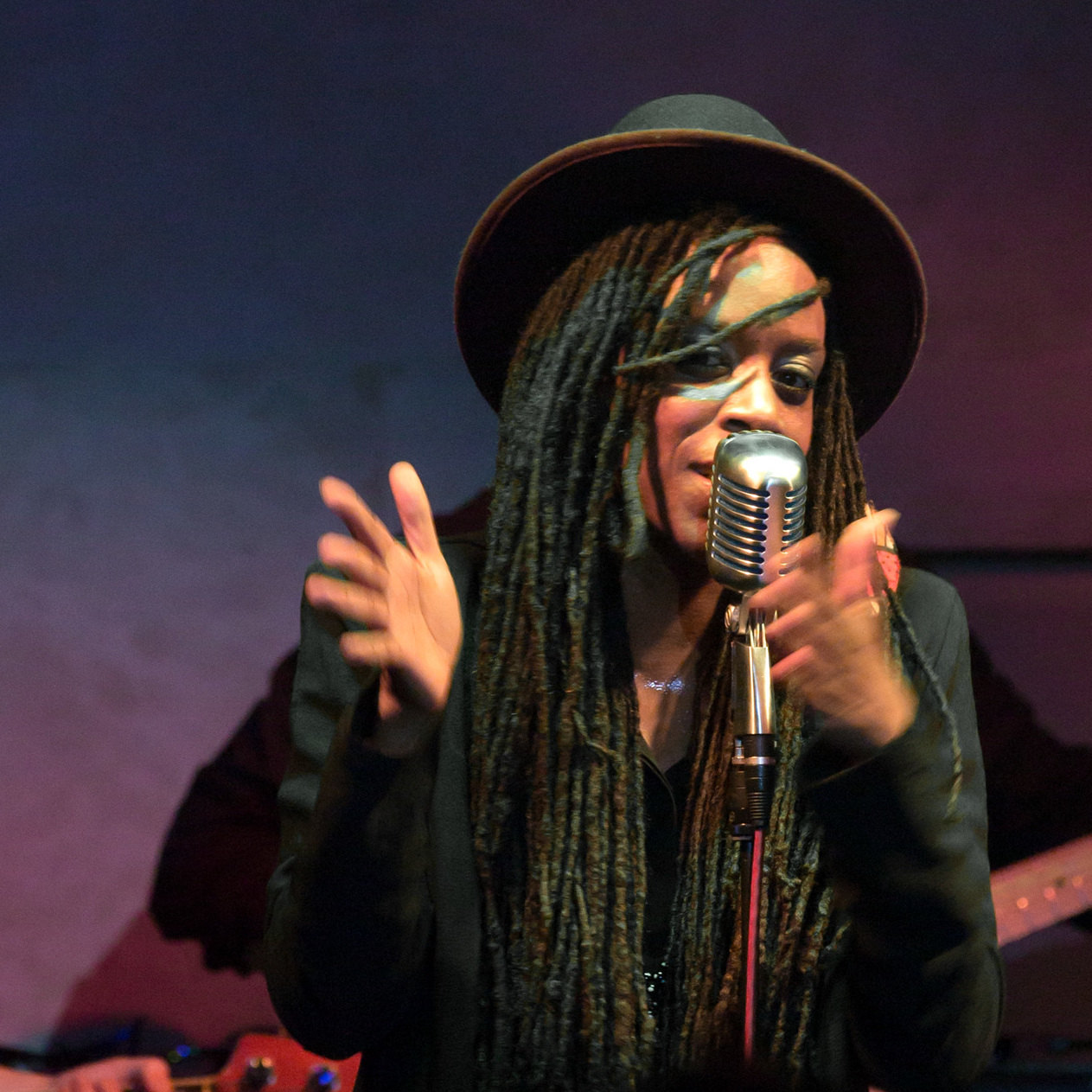
- with The Digflo Band in Vienna in 2015
- Born: Connecticut, US
- Other name: Akua Olatunji
- Occupations: hip hop MC, rapper, poet, professor
- Employer: UC Santa Cruz
- Website: akua-naru.com

Akua Naru (also known as Akua Olatunji), is a rapper from Connecticut, United States. Her hip-hop music incorporates styles including soul and jazz. In 2018 she began archiving the achievements of women in hip-hop at Harvard University as a Nasir Jones Hip-hop Fellow at the Hip-hop Archive Research Institute. Naru has been particularly successful in Europe, where she lived from 2008 until joining the music faculty at University of California, Santa Cruz in 2024. Presently, she holds a Pavel Machotka Chair in Creative Studies at Porter College.

== Life ==
Naru was born and raised in Connecticut in a family that went to church and played gospel music. At the age of nine, Naru's uncle introduced her to hip hop music. It was Akua's grandmother who took her to church, where she met strong, assertive women in the community, which led to her interest in the revolutionary ideas of Angela Davis, Malcolm X and Assata Shakur.

By the time Naru completed her formal education at Rutgers University and the University of Pennsylvania, she had learned her skills as a member of a repertory company where she was able to use recording equipment and perform publicly. Akua left the U.S. to travel to China, ultimately moving to Cologne, Germany, in 2011, where she created her first album "The Journey Aflame" which was produced by "The Drumkidz". Later that year Naru returned to the USA on a 22-date tour. Naru's work is inspired by Toni Morrison and the history of Black women in the United States. Akua Naru has been a guest speaker at universities throughout the US, Germany, Nigeria, Tanzania, Kenya, and Sudan. She has performed on the continents of North America, South America, Europe, and Africa.

== Discography ==
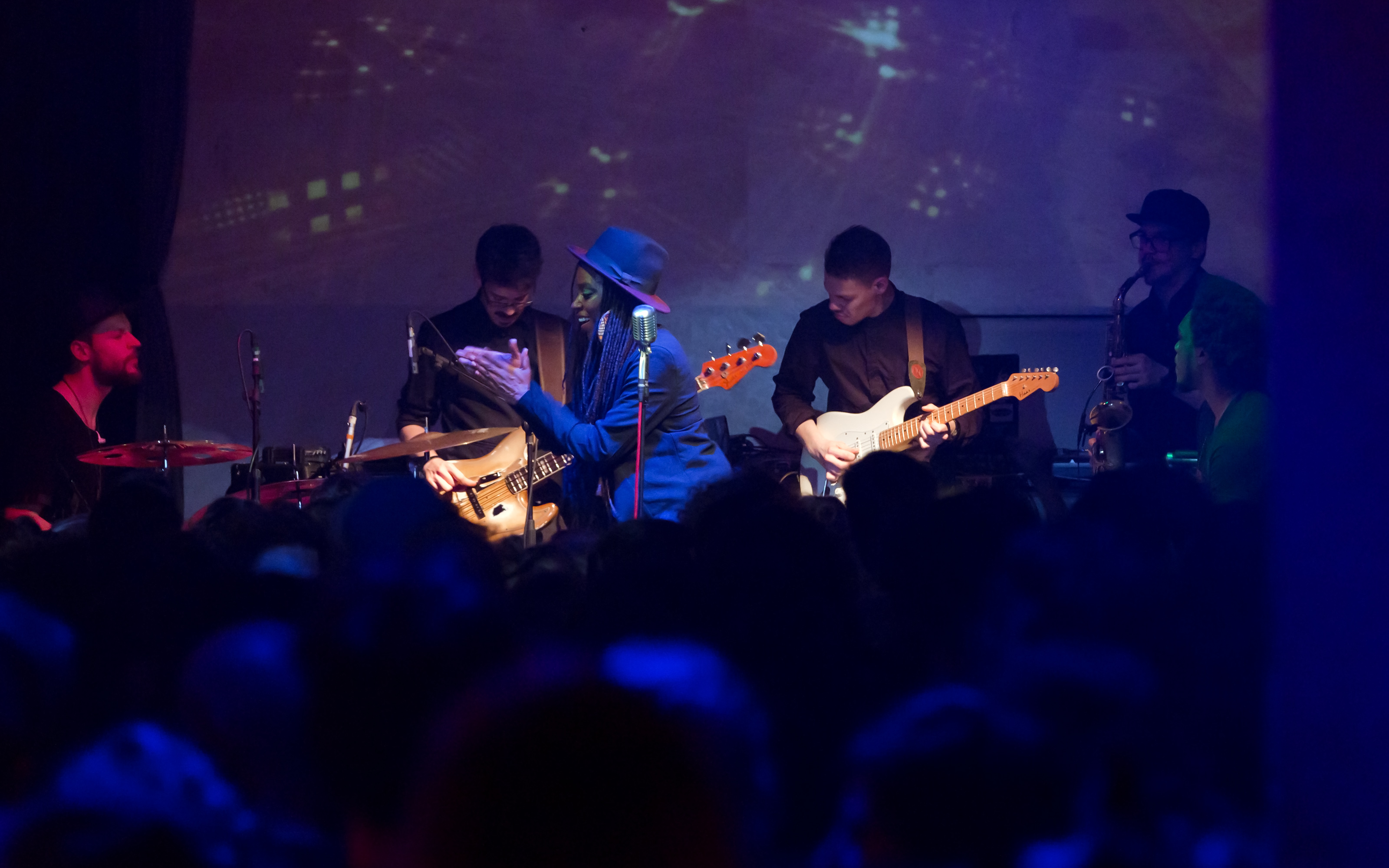
Her Digflo Band in 201

Studio albums

- The Journey Aflame (2011)
- The Miner's Canary (2015)
- The Blackest Joy (2018)
- All About Love: New Visions (2024)

EP

- Poetry: How Does It Feel? (2011)

Live releases

- The Live & Aflame Sessions (2012)
