= Patrice Bart-Williams =

German reggae singer (born 1979)

Patrice
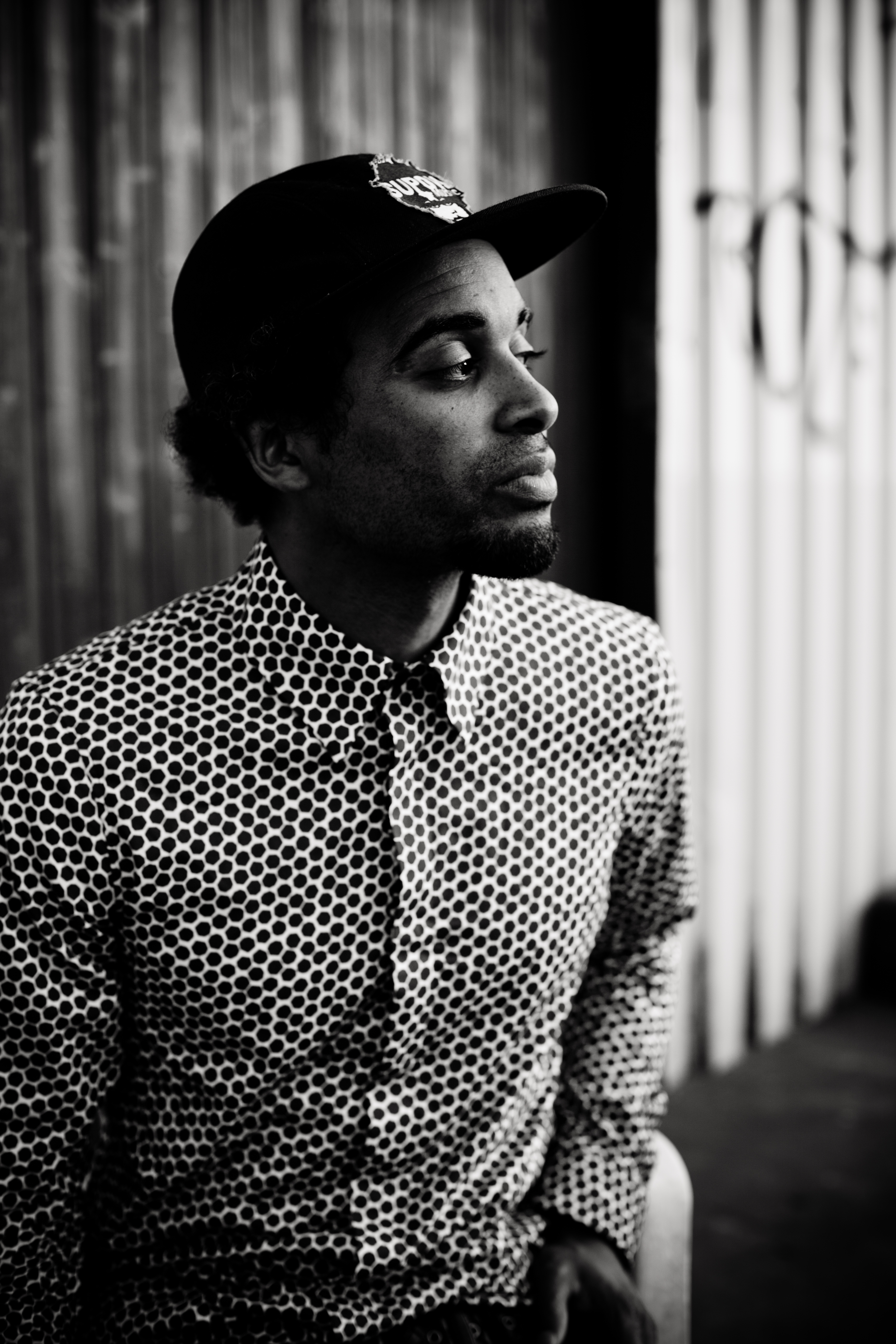
- Patrice in 2013

Background information
- Also known as: Patrice Babatunde
- Born: Patrice Bart-Williams; 9 July 1979 (age 47); Cologne, West Germany
- Genre: Reggae
- Years active: 1999–present
- Label: Supow Music
- Website: patrice.net

Patrice Babatunde Bart-Williams (born 9 July 1979), better known as Patrice, is a German reggae singer, songwriter and record producer. Born in Germany to a Sierra Leonean father and a German mother, Patrice grew up listening to Fela Kuti, Bob Marley, Champion Jack Dupree, Max Romeo, Buju Banton, dancehall and hip hop music, writing his own songs from the age of 12.

== Early life ==
Patrice was born the same day his paternal grandfather died, causing his father to give him the middle name, "Babatunde", which means "the father has returned". His first name was inspired by Patrice Lumumba. Patrice's father, Gaston Bart-Williams, a Sierra Leone Creole, was the country's first film director. He encouraged Patrice to meet many and interact with many musical acts passing through Germany, sparking an early interest in diverse genres. Gaston died in a boating accident when Patrice was 11 years old.

Patrice began playing guitar and writing songs in early adolescence, after the loss of his father. He attended Schule Schloss Salem, a private boarding school in Baden-Württemberg, Southern Germany often considered one of the most elite schools in Europe.

== Career ==
Influenced heavily by reggae, skate culture and punk music, Patrice began mixing genres and styles. He formed an Afro-beat/reggae band called Bantu through which he met producer Matthias Arfmann, who subsequently produced Patrice's debut EP, Lions, released in 1999. Later that same year, Patrice supported Lauryn Hill on the European leg of her Miseducation tour.

Lions began attracting attention from major labels who were interested in the reggae, soul and folk sound of the EP. In 2000, Sony released Patrice's first full-length album, Ancient Spirits. Two years later, the album How Do You Call It was released, featuring the single, "Sunshine". Patrice had already begun to produce his own music.

Patrice went on to collaborate with German reggae collective Silly Walks in 2003 and released the project "Silly Walks Meets Patrice". This constant output of albums and uncategorizable catalogue became emblematic of Patrice's musical style and allowed him to attract a diverse range of fans and critics. He gained followings within different fan bases and began to successfully headline Europe's biggest music festivals.

Patrice soon began fighting for independence from major labels, and assumed almost all of the production responsibilities for his albums. He fought to be known as an uncompromising indie artist. "Every album is a fun struggle with my worst enemy; which is myself. I'm always trying to stay true to myself and therefore I need to change constantly. I need to destroy my habits, patterns and comfort zones to be able to make room for something new... something real. This always surprises or disappoints but it never goes unnoticed". He formed his indie label, Supow Music, in Germany.

Patrice released his third studio album, Nile, in 2005. It quickly rose to top 5 chart positions in Europe, and was followed by a year long sold-out tour that was featured in his 2006 Raw & Uncut live DVD, filmed in one of Paris's largest venues, le Zénith de Paris.

In 2008, the LP Free Patri-Ation was released through Universal. Singles "Clouds" and "Another One" topped the charts.

Patrice released his LP, One, in 2010. The moniker of the album was inspired by a personal philosophy of the musician. "No living being is truly autonomous. The planet is a unique mass of materials and of moving energy, they are not separated by the elements that they are composed of. I think that in terms of music, it is the same".

2013's Rising of the Son, was mainly produced by Patrice. Its opening song and single, "Alive", featured a version with Busy Signal.

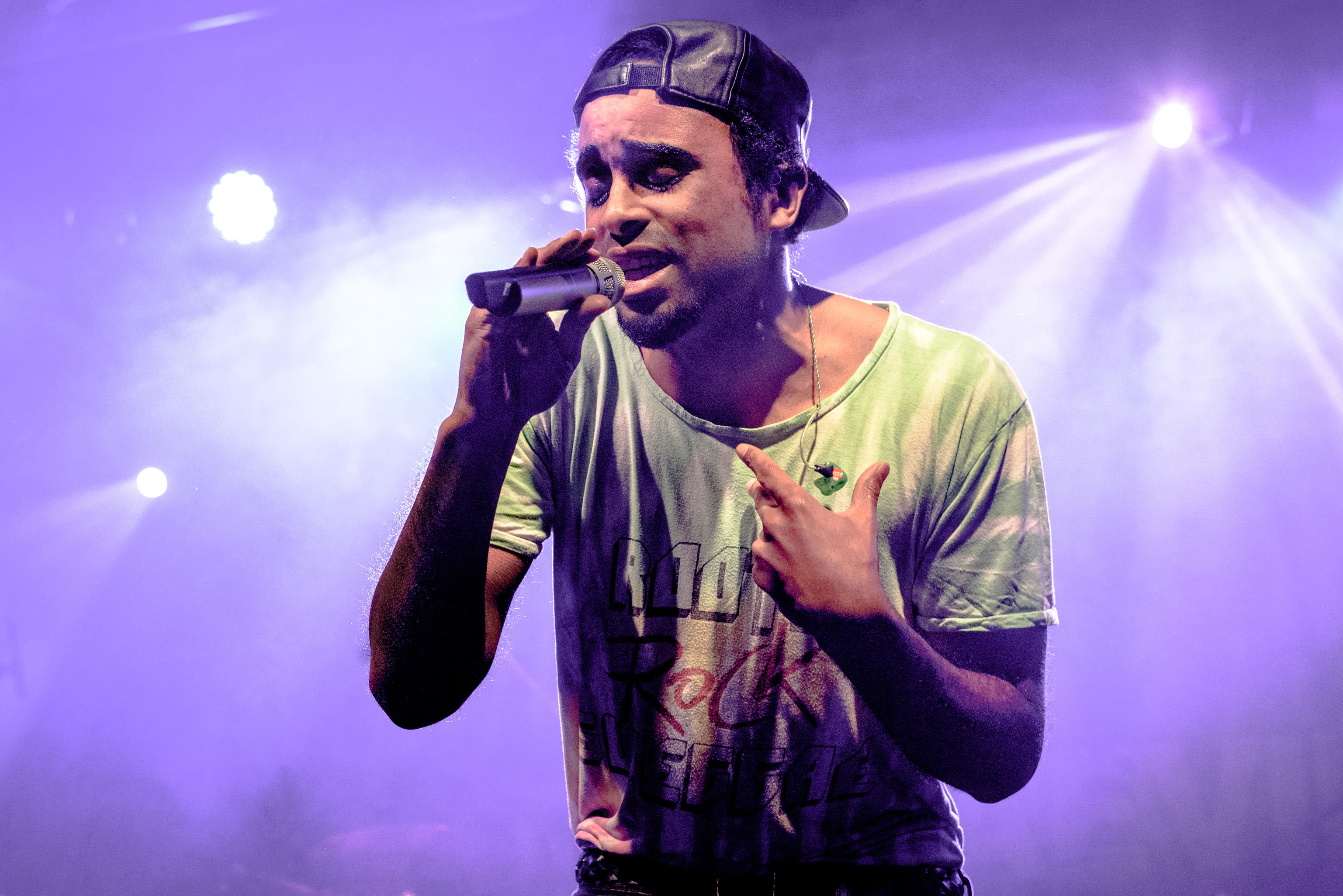
Patrice performing in 2016

After One, and expressed most with Rising of the Son, Patrice coined a new genre for his music, termed "sweggae". He states, "I tried to find a common ground between all these things I love. Blues, hip hop, dancehall, singer-songwriter music, Afro-beat, rock, philosophy, poetry, and the list is long. I didn't want it to sound like a mix but a style that in a very self explicatory way reflects these times that we're living in. Times in which it's getting hard to tell black from white. Times where cultures and genres are mixed to the point that you can't tell what's what anymore. I am a living symbol of these times. I am looking to create its soundtrack". The French newspaper, Le Monde, started using the genre "sweggae" and both they and Patrice describe it as music with reggae undertones with a more modernist take, reflective of someone who created his own culture out of many things.

Summer 2016 saw the release of the single "Burning Bridges", produced by the French Picard Brothers, who provided Major Lazer with their latest single, and co-written by the singer MO as well as Diplo himself. Patrice's album Life's Blood was planned for release on 30 September 2016.

Patrice continues to tour regularly throughout Europe, North and South America and Africa, often with his house band, the Supowers.

Patrice is currently represented under Because Music for France and Belgium and his own label, Supow Music, for Germany, Austria, Switzerland and the rest of the world.

== Production work ==
Patrice has produced or co-produced most of his own albums, including 2013's Rising of the Son. In 2011, Patrice produced Selah Sue's single "Ragga Muffin", which was followed by a US version featuring J. Cole. Production work was also done with Goody Mob's Cee Lo Green. Her album went on to sell one million copies. He produced Cody ChesnuTT's album Landing on a Hundred in 2012, which was ChesnuTT's first release after a 10-year hiatus.

In an interview, Patrice talked about why he needed to produce. "As a producer for others I learned a lot about the mistakes WE artistes tend to make. Like throwing away the best vocal take or not trying to use our best song because we don't like it. I do not want to do that anymore".

Following in his father's footsteps, Patrice delved into film by scoring the documentaries of street artist JR's Women are Heroes, and Inside Out. JR subsequently did the cover art of One and crafted the 2013 and 2014 stage art for Patrice's performances and videos.

== Projects ==
Patrice commissioned the cultural series Super Sunday, a monthly event that brought together some of the top musical acts from around the world, and included a spoken word brunch, which featured Saul Williams. A live art installations and a dinner by renown German chef, Nelson Muller. A group of local musicians were selected to form the event's house band after an extensive audition process. Patrice did this because he felt that professional musicians were sometimes lacking in fire and passion for the craft. As part of the local element of the event, established artists shared the stage with audience members during jam sessions of the Super Sunday event.

Featured artists have included Youssoupha, Guizmo, Cody ChesnuTT, Tiken Jah Fakoly, Irma and Protoje. Patrice stated that his intention was to begin cultivating a hive of creative talent, "by getting people together and making them network". In a series of interviews, he said "mixing, or metissage, is the future. Anyone who closes themselves to that is not very modern thinking". All the artists were actual acquaintances of Patrice who he felt might appreciate a new type of platform.

Patrice has become known for epic performances that trail a large range of large venues to small, intimate features. He has performed at daybreak at the Timbuktu Festival as well as a midnight sun feature in Norway. Patrice will often use direct-marketing techniques through social media to inform his fans of where he would be performing, the most recent ones being sunrise performances joined by thousands of followers in Paris, Berlin, New York, and London's best locations.

== Discography ==
=== Albums ===
Year	Title	Chart positions				
Year	Title	GER	AUT	FRA	ITA	SWI
2000	Ancient Spirit	–	–	–	–	–
2002	How Do You Call It?	22	–	68	–	69
2003	Silly Walks Meets Patrice	–	–	158	–	–
2005	Nile	4	5	51	50	12
2006	Raw & Uncut - Live in Paris	–	–	81	–	79
2008	Free-Patri-Ation	12	20	16	–	15
2010	One	22	58	18	–	54
2013	The Rising of the Son	11	38	16	–	9
2016	Life's Blood	48	–	43	–	47

=== Singles and EPs ===
Year	Title	Chart positions		
Year	Title	GER	AUT	ITA
1998	Lions (EP)	–	–	–
2000	"Everyday Good"	–	–	–
2000	"You Always You"	–	–	–
2002	"Up in My Room"	99	–	–
2003	"Sunshine"	–	–	10
2003	"Music"	–	–	–
2003	"Moonrise"	–	–	–
2004	"Truly Majestic"	–	–	–
2005	"Soulstorm"	65	60	–
2008	"Clouds"	64	75	–
2008	"Another One"	83	68	–
