= Abiodun (musician) =

Nigerian-German singer (born 1972)

- Also known as: Abiodun, Don Abi (former moniker)
- Born: Abiodun Odukoya; 23 December 1972 (age 53); London, England
- Origin: Lagos, Nigeria
- Genre: Afrosofunk
- Instrument: Vocals
- Years active: 1993–present
- Label: Ajazco Records
- Website: abiodun-music.com

Abiodun Odukoya (born 23 December 1972), better known as Abiodun, is a Nigerian-German singer, songwriter, producer and music arranger. Abiodun's name is of Yoruba origin and means "he who is born on a day of festivity". He is better known as the co founder of the Afro German music collective Brothers Keepers and as one of the pioneers of the German reggae, afro and soul music scene.

== Early years ==
Abiodun was born in London. He is the son of a German mother and a Nigerian father. Abiodun grew up in Lagos, Nigeria where he was exposed to music through his parents vast and eclectic collection which ranged from reggae to juju, afrobeat, pop, funk and hiphop. After the death of his father in 1986 his family relocated to Cologne, Germany. Abiodun is the younger brother of musician and activist Ade Bantu.

== Career (1993 to present) ==
Abiodun started his recording career under the moniker DON ABI. In 1993 when he released his first single "Criminality" with Vibe Tribe Soundsystem. A year later he was invited by pioneering German Hip-hop producer Future Rock (LSD) to work on American Funk saxophonist Maceo Parker's single "Keep your Soul together". In 1995 Abiodun was featured on Germany's first Reggae Dancehall Sampler "Dancehall Power Vol.1" this led to tours with his High Voltage Band and extensive collaborations with the Hamburger Dub Reggae collective "Di Iries".

In 1998 he founded the musical project BANTU with his brother Ade Bantu, Patrice and Amaechi this gave him the opportunity to rekindle the musical connection with his African heritage. Bantu's debut album "Fufu" was released in 2000 and it became an instant success in Nigeria with two hit radio singles "Nzogbu" & "Fire Inna Dancehall".

Abiodun collaborated with Patrice Bart-Williams on his debut Album "Ancient Spirit" writing and producing the Song "Life Hard". In 2001 he co founded the Afro-German musical collective Brothers Keepers. Their song "Adriano (die letzte Warnung)" (Adriano the final warning) was released and it became an anti racism anthem selling well over 220,000 copies and making it to the Top 5 of the German pop charts.

In 2003 he was signed to V2 Records where he released "Act of Love" a mini LP, which was well received by music critics and fans around Europe. He was highly active on the live Circuit with his Band Okada Supersound touring and headlining show such as Rottweil Jazz Festival, Reggae Summer Jam, Bochum Total, Chiemsee Reggae Summer, Rototom Sunsplash Italy, Wiesen Sunsplash Austria and Womex 2004. He also toured with and supported Brothers Keepers, Bantu, Angelique Kidjo, Keziah Jones and many others. In 2003 Abiodun was featured on British reggae band UB40's single "Rudie (Hold It Down)" alongside Adé Bantu and German reggae singer Gentleman. The song gave him the opportunity to work with the legendary Jamaican singer Gregory Isaacs on "Reason for Love" a tune produced by Neil Perch of Zion Train. The song was based on the Rudie Riddim. In 2005 he was featured on Brothers Keepers second album "Am I My Brothers Keeper" and Bantu's "Fuji Satisfaction", an album that won critical acclaim and the Kora Awards as "Best Group West Africa" and "Best Group Africa" in 2005.

Abiodun finally released his Debut Album "No Philosophy " in 2007 on the independent Label "Toolhouse Recordings". Abiodun has been featured on Albums and Projects with acclaimed electronic producers such as Burnt Friedman, Salz, Razoof and Solar Moon. In 2012 he dropped the artist name Don Abi opting to use his birth name Abiodun.

Abiodun is highly active with his current Band on the live circuit in Germany and in Africa.

In April 2018 he released the single "Living for the Positive" (including a video clip) by Ajazco Records. It's an up-tempo song, reminiscent of the legendary soul sound of Stax and Motown, incorporating timeless, punchy gospel and rock influences.

In September 2018 his single and videoclip "Alarm don blow" was released by Ajazco Records. Alarm don blow is a catchy afrobeat rock song with a retro-modern like lilt to it. Its undulating guitar riffs provides its rocky edge, which recalls a Jimi Hendrix or Carlos Santana jam session. Without being preachy, Abiodun's song has a moral message that places it within an activist afrobeat tradition. It's a call to individuals to do what is right or morally sane, for the society; or to perform their duties as responsible citizens within sociopolitical institutions. The video was shot in Lagos (Nigeria) and in Cologne (Germany) by videographer Mirko Polo.

In October 2018 Abiodun's album "Break Free" was released by Ajazco Records. It's an authentic, handmade mix of global pop sounds. It fuses different musical genres like afrobeat, soul, funk, pop and rock. "Break Free" is made up of eleven contrasting songs created by an uncompromising artist. They are soulful and energetic but, at the same time, contemplative, fragile and sensitive. Musicians that was involved in the making of the album: Gert Kapo (keys, musical director, composer, co-producer, arranger), Vincent 'Themba' Goritzki (guitars), Roman Fuchß (bass), Giuseppe Coppola (drums), Roland Peil (percussion), Mirta Junco Wambrug (background vocals), Martha Stencel (background vocals), Melande Nkounkolo (background vocals).

== Ajazco Records (2011 – present ) ==
Abiodun is the founder and CEO of Ajazco Records, a label and platform aiming to support projects and up and coming musicians to develop their own brand and profile and promote their music to a wider audience. Ajazco Records has several singles to its portfolio and has released the first Indigenous Yoruba Rap Split-Album with Samnem and DQ, which was produced by Abiodun.

== Workshops and NGO's (2011–present ) ==
Abiodun has worked as a music instructor, coach and producer for Kabawil. He is in charge of conceptualisation and co-ordination of their Music Theater productions. He is also involved as a music instructor and coach for the cross cultural performing arts workshop Framewalk. A module developed to link performing arts students from around the world. He has worked with students from Israel, Ghana, Germany, Burkina Faso, Ethiopia and South Africa.

== Discography ==
Abiodun

- 10/2018 Break Free (Album - Ajazco Records)
- 09/2018 Alarm don blow (Single - Ajazco Records)
- 04/2018 Living for the Positive (Single - Ajazco Records)

DonAbi

- 1993 Vibe Tribe Soundsystem – Criminality (Vibetribe)
- 1994 Keep your Soul together – Maceo Parker (Minor Music)
- 1994 Liberation Thru Music & Lyrics – Weep Not Child (Groove Attack)
- 1995 Di Iries (Buback Records)
- 1995 Dancehall Power Vol.1 (SPV)
- 2000 Ancient Spirit – Patrice (Yo Mama)
- 2001 Salz- Desire (Salz )
- 2001 Girl you look so good (96 degrees)
- 2002 Beatboxing Volume.1 (Rough Trade )
- 2003 Can't cool – Burnt Friedman & The Nu Dub Players (Non Place )
- 2003 Act of Love (V2 Records)
- 2007 No Philosophy (Toolhouse Recordings)
- 2010 Celebration (Ajazco Records )
- 2011 Someone Help me out – WNT (Ajazco Records)
- 2011 Don't get me wrong –WNT (Ajazco Records )
- 2012 Disco Ballerina (Funky Mamas And Papas Recordings )

with Razoof

- 2004 Soul Aquarium ( Nesta Recordings)
- 2009 High Tide Low Tide (CPK)
- 2014 Jahliya Sound (Poets Club Records)

with BANTU

- 2000 Fufu (Kennis Music)
- 2004 Bantu (Nitty Gritty Music/Rough Trade)
- 2005 Fuji Satisfaction (Piranha Records)

with Brothers Keepers

- 2001 Adriano (Wea Rec )
- 2001 Lightkultur (WEA Rec)
- 2005 Bereit (Sony)
- 2005 Will we ever Know ( Sony)
- 2005 Am I My Brothers Keeper?(Sony)

Prizes and Awards

- KORA All African Award (2005) "Best Group Africa" & "Best Group West Africa"- with BANTU
- Einslive Radio Award (2001) "Adriano" – Brothers Keepers
