= ADEFRA =

German political organization for Black women

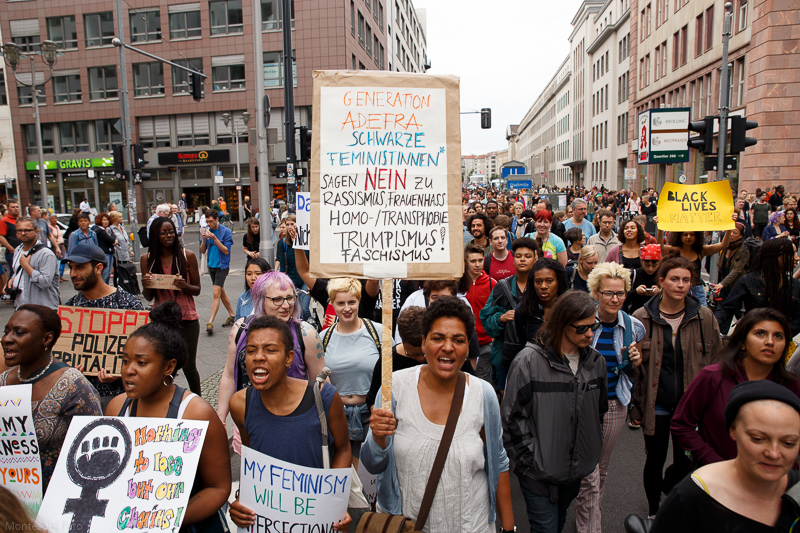
A protester at a 2017 Black Lives Matter demonstration in Berlin holds a Generation ADEFRA sign.

Generation ADEFRA – Schwarze Frauen in Deutschland (Black Women in Germany) is a Berlin-based German cultural and political organization for Black women and other women of color. Founded in 1986, it is considered the first grassroots activist group for Afro-German women.

== History ==
ADEFRA was founded in 1986 by a small circle of Black feminists and lesbians, including Katja Kinder, Elke Jank, Katharina Oguntoye, Eva von Pirch, Daniela Tourkazi, Judy Gummich, and Jasmin Eding. They were inspired by the American poet and activist Audre Lorde and other activists' coinage of the political self-definition "Afro-German," and had joined together in part to produce the book Showing Our Colors: Afro-German Women Speak Out. As confirmed in ADEFRA's 20th-anniversary brochure in 2006, the initial meetings with Lorde, her subsequent visits to Germany, and the publication of Showing Our Colors were crucial catalysts for the movement.

ADEFRA is considered the first grassroots activist group in Germany that was both by and for Black women. The group's name, ADEFRA, is an abbreviation of "Afrodeutsche Frauen" (Afro-German women). The name also came to be associated with an Amharic word meaning "the woman who shows courage."

ADEFRA is a sister organization to the broader Initiative of Black People in Germany (Initiative Schwarze Menschen in Deutschland). Together, they were considered the two largest Afro-German sociopolitical organizations as of the early 2000s. While ADEFRA maintained close ties with the Initiative Schwarze Menschen in Deutschland (ISD), the relationship evolved over the years. Initial ISD meetings sometimes perpetuated misogyny, sexism, and homophobia, which alienated female members. These challenges reflected similar dynamics in other left-wing social movements of the 1960s and 1970s. However, ADEFRA and ISD developed a unique collaborative relationship that distinguished them from other contemporary movements. Local ADEFRA and ISD chapters, particularly in Berlin and Munich, often shared resources and worked together on joint initiatives. This cooperation encouraged ISD's male members to confront issues of misogyny, homophobia, and feminism within their organization.

After its founding, affiliated groups formed in several German cities. The organization held annual national meetings until the mid-1990s. After the fall of the Berlin Wall, ADEFRA members worked to unify Black women in both East and West Germany, with the group holding its first post-unification national meeting in December 1990 in Munich.

The organization was based in Munich until the late 1990s. In 2000, its headquarters moved to Berlin, where it is currently based. It is now known as Generation ADEFRA.

== Activities ==
ADEFRA member Ika Hügel-Marshall described the organization as a "forum where Black women can express their concerns with a broad spectrum of topics such as politics, education, lifestyle, and health." It is intended as a space where Black women can share their experiences and connect with one another, as Black people in Germany at the time of its founding largely lived in isolation from each other and spent most of their time in predominantly white spaces. The organization also pushed back on racism within the German feminist movement at the time of its founding.

ADEFRA is open to all Black women, regardless of age or sexual orientation; it has been classified by members including Peggy Piesche as a "Black queer-feminist community." In addition to women from the African diaspora, the group has included members of other minority groups in Germany, including Asian Germans.

The organization holds readings, workshops, and other events on such topics as anti-racism and the history of Black Europeans. It also hosts larger conferences, including the 2006 20th-anniversary conference Generation ADEFRA — Schwarze Autonomie in Deutschland?, which was paired with an exhibit at the Museum Europäischer Kulturen. It is particularly focused on empowerment through education, including through the Black European Studies (BEST) project, and it has also been involved in international initiatives.

In the 1980s, ADEFRA published its own magazine, Afrekete, which was edited by Elke Jank.

== Notable members ==
- May Ayim
- Ika Hügel-Marshall
- Bärbel Kampmann
- Katharina Oguntoye
- Peggy Piesche
