= Mandenga Diek =

Cameroon-born businessman who became a German citizen in 1896

- Mandenga Diek during his time in Danzig
- Born: Mandenga Diek; 15 September 1871; Belltown, Douala, Cameroon
- Died: 21 June 1943 (aged 71); Danzig, Reichsgau Danzig-West Prussia, Germany
- Occupations: Shoemaker and businessman
- Known for: First black person to acquire citizenship of the German Empire

Mandenga Diek (15 September 1871 – 21 June 1943) was a shoemaker and businessman who is known as the first black person to acquire citizenship of the German Empire. Born in Belltown, Douala, Cameroon, into an upper-class family, Diek travelled to Hamburg in 1891 for education. At that time, his home was a German colony. In Hamburg, Diek started an apprenticeship with a shoemaker and passed his examinations as a journeyman. In 1895, his daughter, Erika Mandenga, was born; Diek obtained Hamburg (hence German) citizenship in 1896 and married Erika's mother in 1897. He was not allowed to return to Cameroon with his family and became a salesman and trader in Hamburg. He later moved to Danzig (Gdańsk), where he married for a second time, fathering two daughters. He started a wholesale business trading in colonial goods and lived a comfortable life until the Nazi Party took power in 1933 and he and his family suffered harassment. After unsuccessfully attempting to return to Cameroon, Diek died in 1943.

As one of very few Africans with German citizenship, Diek was part of self-help networks and co-signed Martin Dibobe's petition for Cameroonian rights. His wife and daughters suffered persecution during the Nazi era, but survived and escaped forced sterilisation attempts. His great-grandchildren Abenaa and Roy Adomako are part of Afro-German activism.

== Early life and first marriage ==
Mandenga Diek was born on 15 September 1871 in Belltown, Douala, Cameroon. (Note: According to the civil registers of Hamburg and of Danzig, his parents were Usake Diek and Udumbe Diek née Nyamakong.) From 1884, Cameroon was a colony of the German Empire under the name of Kamerun. Together with his brother Anjo Diek and with Georg L. Ekambi (who both later worked as performers in Berlin), he arrived in Hamburg on 16 May 1891 on a Woermann-Linie ship. The Dieks came from an upper class family; they were part of a group of mostly noble Duala people who migrated to Germany to study or to learn a trade. According to his family, Mandenga Diek's father had wanted him to study medicine, but he fainted when he attempted to dissect a corpse in anatomy class. He then became a shoemaker's apprentice, later qualifying as a journeyman on 10 December 1894. Katharina Oguntoye considers it likely that the apprenticeship had been arranged before Diek came to Hamburg and that he had already learned some German in Cameroon. His daughters stated that after his employer had displayed him in the shop window to attract customers, Diek quit and started his own business as a merchant.

With Friederike Schöning, a policeman's daughter from Hamburg, he fathered a daughter, Erika Mandenga, who was born in November 1895. They were married in August 1897 and later divorced. (Note: According to the marriage certificate, they were married on 21 August 1897 and divorced on 23 February 1917.) In order to marry, Diek obtained citizenship of Hamburg and thus of the German Empire on 23 November 1896, making him one of very few Africans to obtain German citizenship. At the time, citizenship of one German state automatically conferred citizenship of the German Empire; this changed in 1913 when naturalisation applications additionally had to be reviewed by the other states. Diek is the earliest African known to have become a citizen. His application was helped by his membership of the Lutheran church and by references from Germans who knew him, including his employer and a reserve lieutenant who attested to Diek's diligence. His upper-class background may also have helped him with the application. It is possible that Diek delayed the marriage until after his naturalisation to ensure that his daughter would not lose her German citizenship. In 1895, Diek had applied for funding to return to Cameroon and become a shoemaker there. The colonial authorities at first agreed to the request, but denied the application when Diek attempted to take his family with him in 1898 as not "in the interests of maintaining white authority". They considered the prospect of mixed couples in the colonies as improper and potentially destabilising for public order, and several Africans were denied the opportunity to return home with their German wives. Diek made another attempt to return to Cameroon with his family in 1899, planning to work as a translator for the government, but this was rejected by the German Foreign Office. Diek traveled to Cameroon for a visit in October 1906. Diek's professions in Hamburg were listed as shoemaker, merchant and travelling salesman.

== Life in Danzig, second marriage and death ==
In 1913, Diek moved to Danzig (now Gdańsk, Poland). He first worked as a clerk, but then started his own business importing colonial goods and exchanging foreign currency. After the end of World War I, when Cameroon had become a French colony, he wanted to grow his business into a larger trade company in cooperation with his brothers and other merchants in Douala, but the French colonial authorities refused his request to take a group containing three Germans to Cameroon with him.

Through mutual friends, Diek met Emilie Wiedelinski; they married in 1919. Their two daughters, Erika and Doris, were born in 1916 and 1920. (Note: Oguntoye states that Erika was born in 1919, but the birth and baptism certificate has a birth date of 8 March 1916 and a baptism date of 26 September 1916, originally as Erika Wiedelinski.) Wiedelinski's mother, who was from a village in East Prussia, was at first opposed to the marriage but became close to her son-in-law after the children were born. The Dieks lived comfortably in a sizable 5-room apartment. When Danzig became the Free City of Danzig, an autonomous city state that was no longer part of Germany, the Diek family had to give up their Hamburg passports and became citizens of the Free State instead, which did not automatically make them German citizens. Diek's daughters reported that their father was a respected citizen. When African visitors or travelling entertainers came to Danzig, Diek often invited them for a family meal. After 1933, Nazi party activists started a boycott of Diek's wholesale company, and he soon after closed his business. The family lost their lodgings and had to move. Diek later worked in a previously Jewish company that had been taken over by an SS officer. In c. 1936, Diek was forced to take his daughters out of the private school they attended; his younger daughter was sent to a Polish school for a while. Starting in 1937, Diek's wife Emilie had to report to the local branch of the Office of Racial Policy, where it was suggested that she should leave her husband. She later blamed this harassment and the stress it caused her for a heart attack she suffered in 1939. When Diek applied in 1938 to the French colonial authorities to emigrate to Cameroon with his wife and daughter, his application was refused. In 1939, when Danzig was annexed by Germany, the Diek family were not considered to be eligible for citizenship and became stateless, only receiving alien's passports.

His daughters reported that Diek continued to try to leave for Cameroon, and that after obtaining certificates showing he was suitable for living in the tropics, he was offered permission to leave for Cameroon in May 1943. However, the condition was that he would have to engage in propaganda activities for Nazi Germany. He refused to advertise for a country where his skin colour was unwanted. On his way home from the office, he suffered a heart attack and died in June 1943. (Note: Oguntoye states that Diek had a stroke.) (Note: According to the death certificate, Diek died on 21 June 1943.)

== Community activism ==
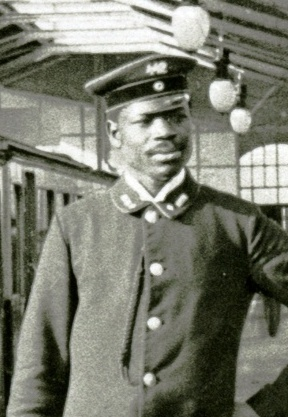
The Cameroonian activist Martin Dibobe in uniform as a train driver in Berlin

Diek helped other African immigrants to Germany. For example, in 1903 and 1904, he represented the Dualans Bruno Ngando and David Ibon Dowo in their dealings with the Imperial Colonial Office. He played a central role in the network of Cameroonians in Hamburg. He was a member of the African Welfare Association (Afrikanischer Hilfsverein), a self-help organisation that provided community support, assistance with the authorities and help with finding employment.

In 1919, Diek and his brother Anjo were both among the signatories of a Cameroonian petition by Martin Dibobe. The petition, submitted before German colonies were ceded to other European powers in the Treaty of Versailles, called for equal rights for Cameroonians, the right to emigrate from the colony and to obtain German citizenship, desegregation of public life in Cameroon, representation in the German parliament, the legality of intermarriage and the improvement of the legal system in the colony, among other things. This quite radical petition for a renewal of the relationship between Cameroon and Germany was unsuccessful and German authorities only published it very selectively.

== Descendants and legacy ==
Diek's first daughter, Erika Mandenga Diek, married Togo-born Bonifatius Folli in 1919, causing her to lose her German citizenship. After their 1923 divorce, she was stateless until 1933, when she successfully applied to be re-naturalised as a German after working at the Reich Accident Insurance Office as a secretary. She lost her citizenship again in 1936. From a previous relationship with Joseph Metziger from Sierra Leone, she had a son who was aged four in 1919. Her son Karl-Heinz Diek, who tried to marry the mother of his three children, the German Irma Franke, in 1940, was forcibly sterilised in 1941; the Gestapo also ordered him to leave his partner. In 1970, Erika Mandenga Diek was voted Hamburg's "most beautiful granny".

The family photograph that is said to have saved Emilie Diek's life

Diek's second daughter Erika, who was unable to obtain an apprenticeship in Danzig, moved to Berlin and married the actor Louis Brody on 9 March 1938. Given the interest of African men in his daughters, Mandenga Diek reportedly declared he was not running a marriage bureau. The Brodys had a daughter named Beryl in 1939. After their divorce, Erika remarried and lived in Berlin. She only regained German citizenship in 1963, after her mother had died stateless. Beryl married a Ghanaian surnamed Adomako and became a dressmaker and model; their daughter Abenaa Adomako later founded the Initiative of Black People in Germany.

After the third daughter, Doris (Dorothea), left school aged 17, c. 1937, she did not find work. When there was a labour shortage in 1939, she first found a job in a warehouse, then obtained better secretarial positions with supportive employers. Her brother-in-law Louis Brody also helped her with film jobs in Berlin and Munich. In 1944, she was banned from getting married and was due to be sterilised, but was allowed to escape from the hospital by a sympathetic policeman. In December of the same year, she was stopped in the streets and sent to a forced labour camp for foreigners based on her lack of German papers, but managed to escape a few weeks later. At the end of the war, she and her mother hid in Bromberg (Bydgoszcz). As Emilie had no papers and only spoke German, the Polish authorities did not believe she was not German. Doris showed them a family photograph to prove she was her mother, saving her from being deported to a camp and possibly saving her life. They started a dance troupe and managed to leave Poland for Berlin, where Doris met her husband, started a family and continued to act in movies until the 1960s.

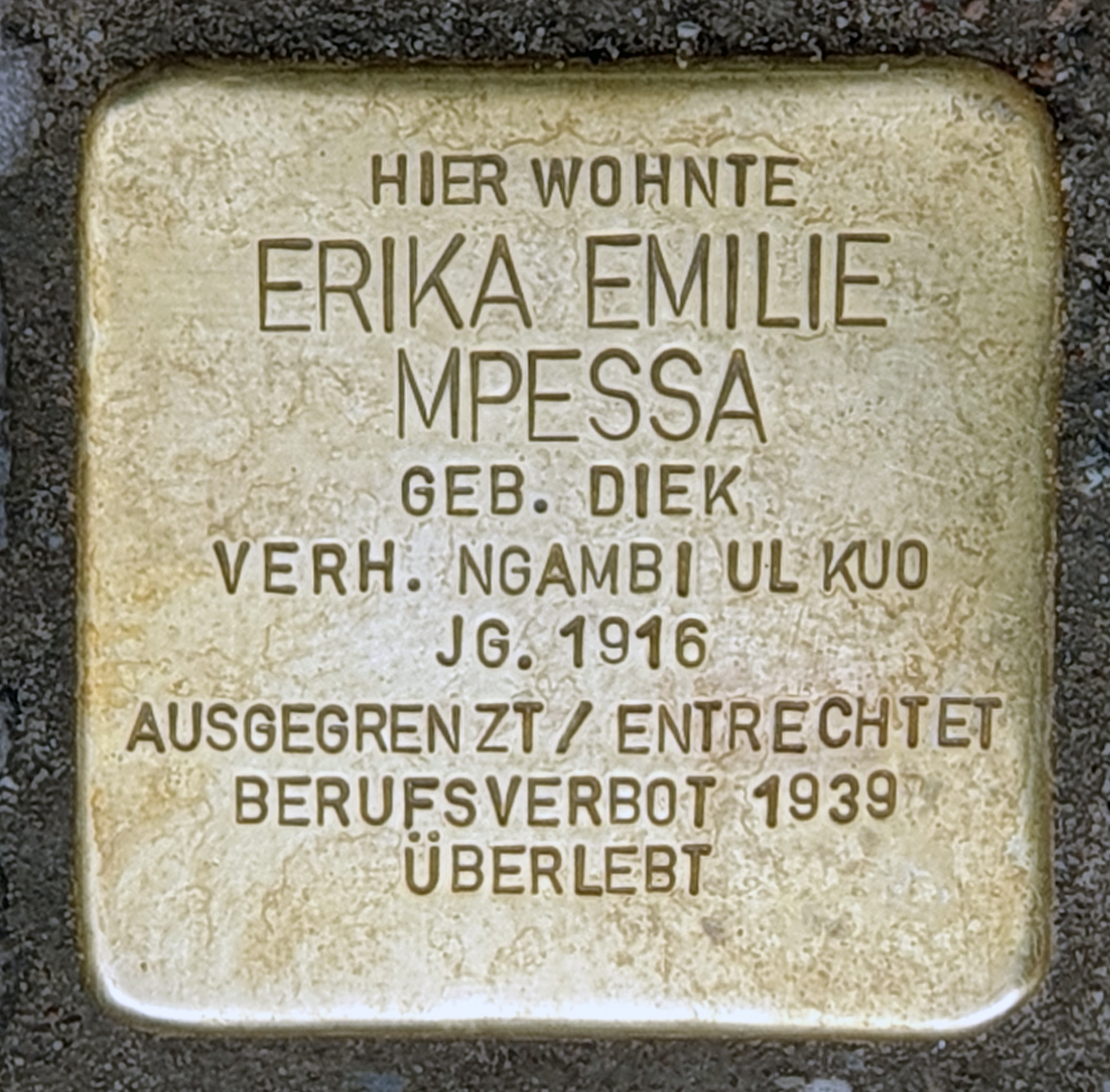
Stolperstein for Erika Diek in Prenzlauer Berg. The inscription translates to "Here lived Erika Emilie Mpessa nee Diek, married Ngambi ul Kuo, born 1916. Excluded/Disenfranchised/Professional ban 1939. Survived."

The Diek sisters Erika and Doris and Erika's granddaughter Abenaa Adomako were interviewed for the 1986 book Showing Our Colors: Afro-German Women Speak Out, which marked the first time they had made their family struggles public, although they were anonymous in the first edition. The German Historical Museum's 2016/17 exhibition "German Colonialism: fragments, past and present" contained a photo installation together with a recording of Diek's great-great-granddaughter Antonia Adomako narrating the family story. The lives of Erika Diek and Louis Brody were commemorated by a Stolperstein for each in 2023. Later that year, Abenaa Adomako and her brother Roy curated an exhibition about the five generations of their family in Germany starting with Mandenga Diek, "In the Footsteps of the Diek Family. Stories of Black People in Tempelhof-Schöneberg" that was shown at the Schöneberg Museum in Berlin. The opening image of the exhibition was a studio photograph of Diek in the 1920s, wearing an elegant suit and two rings, showing him as an elegant member of the bourgeoisie of the time. The Ethiopian-American writer Maaza Mengiste commented on the photograph and stated that the upwards-pointing cigarette added a sense of irony.

== See also ==
- Afro-Germans
- Showing Our Colors: Afro-German Women Speak Out
