= Afro-Germans =

People with African roots living or born in Germany

Afro-Germans Afrodeutsche
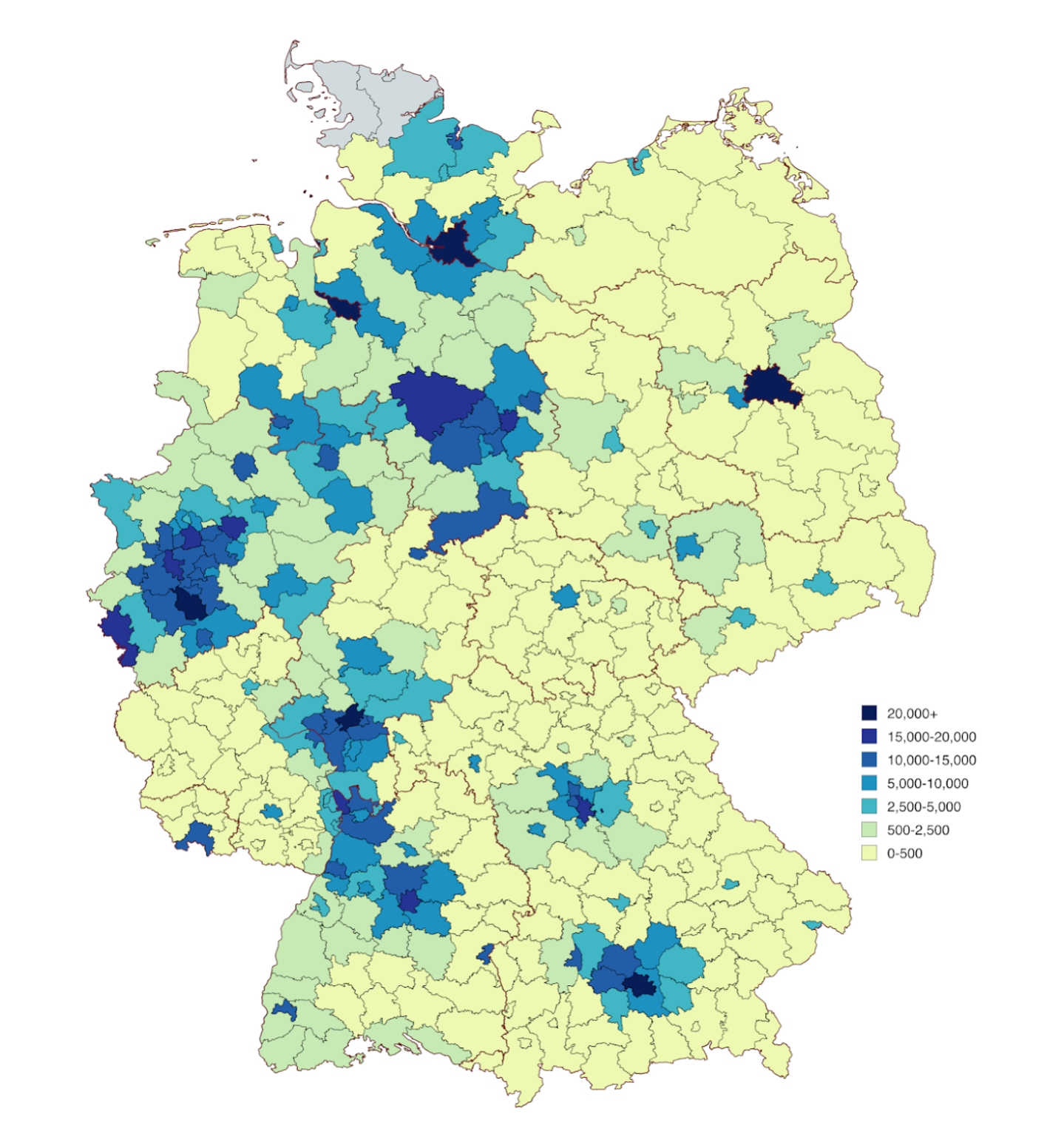

Total population
- from 500 000 to 711 000

Regions with significant populations
- Germany (Berlin, Cologne, Stuttgart, Bremen, Hanover, Frankfurt, Düsseldorf, Munich, Braunschweig, Nuremberg, Hamburg)

Languages
- German, English, French, African languages

Religion
- Christianity, Islam, Lutheranism, Roman Catholicism

Afro-Germans (German: Afrodeutsche) or Black Germans (German: schwarze Deutsche) are German citizens who have ancestry from any of the Black racial groups of Africa.

Cities such as Hamburg and Frankfurt, which were formerly centres of occupation forces following World War II and more recent immigration, have substantial Afro-German communities. With modern trade and migration, communities such as Frankfurt, Berlin, Munich, and Cologne have an increasing number of Afro-Germans. The German census does not use race as a category. The number of persons "having an extended migrant background" (mit Migrationshintergrund im weiteren Sinn, meaning having at least one grandparent born outside Germany) from Africa, is reported as over 1,000,000. The Initiative Schwarzer Deutscher ("Black German Initiative") estimates the total of Germans with African ancestry to be over 1,000,000 persons (of these 500,000 are Black Sub-Saharan Africans).

| Number | City | Number(total) | 2 largest nationalities from Africa |
|---|---|---|---|
| 1 | Berlin | 115,000 | Nigeria and Ghana |
| 2 | Hamburg | 55,500 | Ghana and Nigeria |
| 3 | Cologne | 30,000 | Morocco and Nigeria |
| 4 | Munich | 26,500 | Nigeria and Ethiopia |
| 5 | Frankfurt am Main | 23,100 | Morocco and Eritrea |
| 6 | Bremen | 20,500 | Ghana and Nigeria |
| 7 | Düsseldorf | 19,200 | Morocco and Nigeria |
| 8 | Hanover | 18,700 | Ghana and Nigeria |
| 9 | Stuttgart | 18,400 | Nigeria and Egypt |
| 10 | Dortmund | 17,900 | Morocco and Ghana |
| 11 | Essen | 17,300 | Cameroon and Nigeria |
| 12 | Nuremberg | 16,800 | Ethiopia and Eritrea |
| 13 | Braunschweig | 15,300 | Tunisia and Cameroon |
| 14 | Mannheim | 15,200 | Eritrea and Morocco |
| 15 | Duisburg | 14,700 | Nigeria and Eritrea |
| 16 | Bonn | 14,500 | Morocco and Tunisia |
| 17 | Karlsruhe | 13,600 | Eritrea and Morocco |
| 18 | Kiel | 13,400 | Ghana and Nigeria |
| 19 | Bochum | 13,400 | Ghana and Cameroon |
| 20 | Wiesbaden | 12,800 | Morocco and Eritrea |
| 21 | Aachen | 12,200 | Morocco and Nigeria |

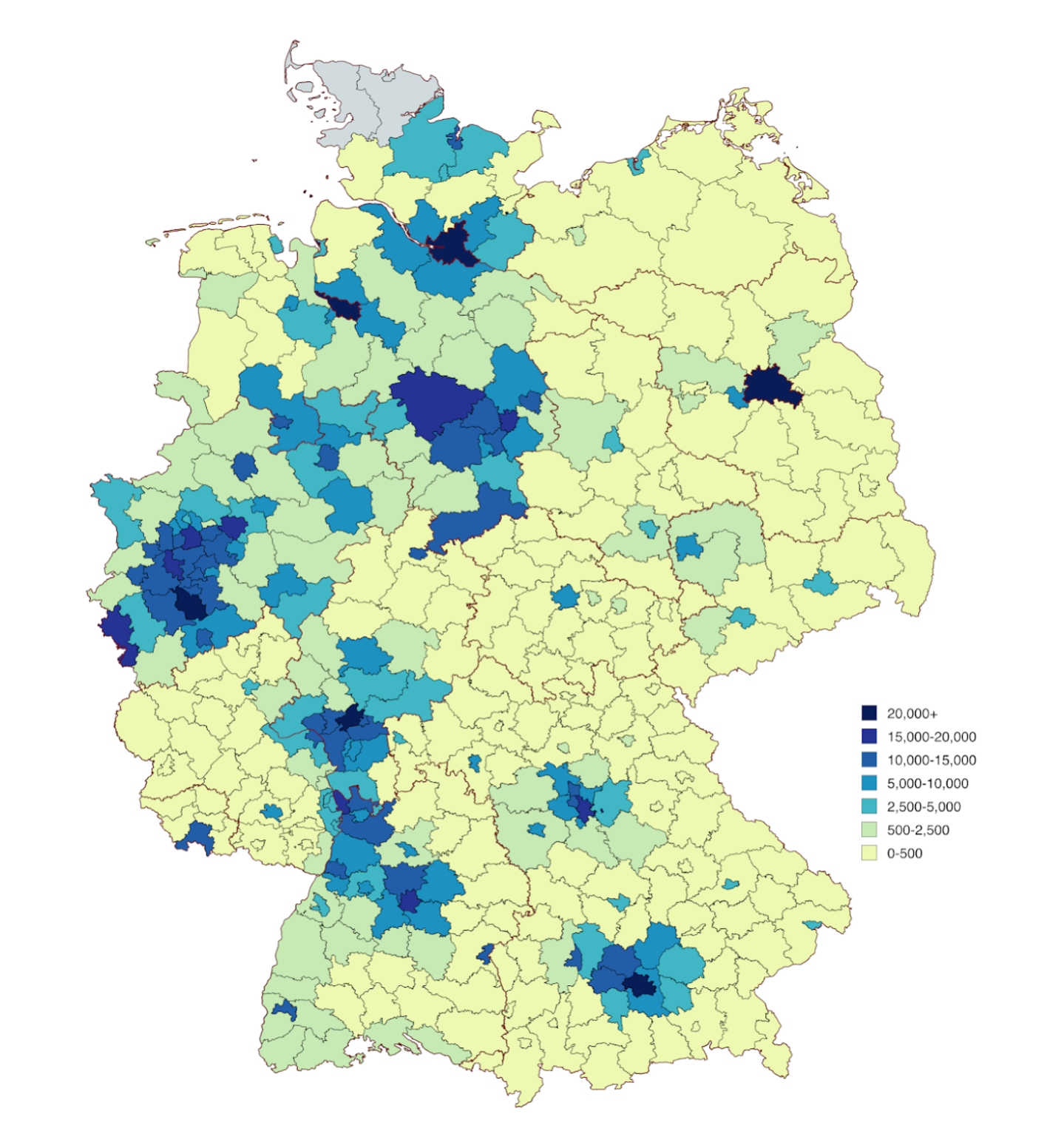
Africans in Germany

In total at least 711 000 people of Subsharan-African origin.

== History ==
=== Africans and German interaction between 1884 and 1945 ===
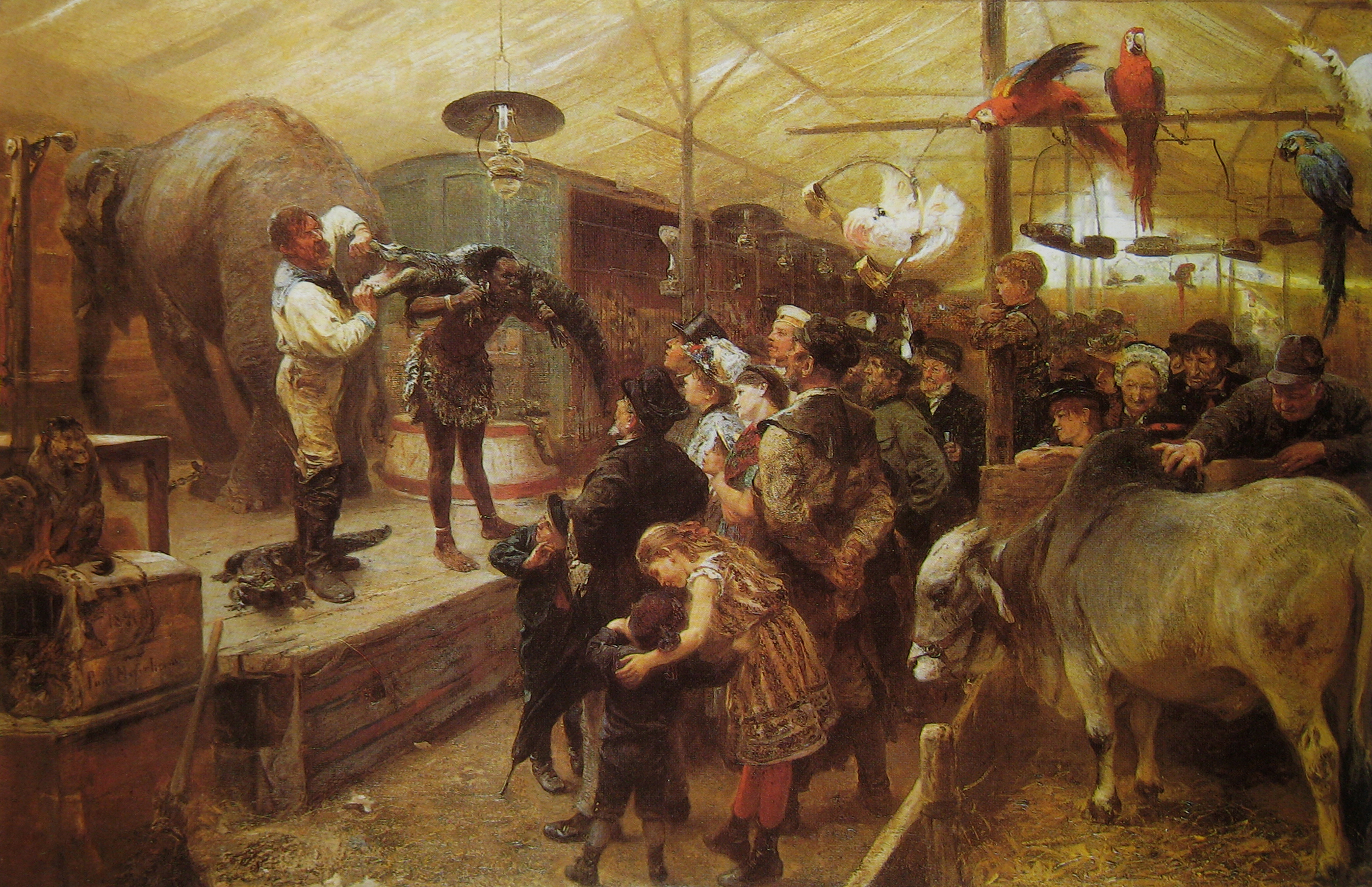
Paul Friedrich Meyerheim: In der Tierbude (In the menagerie), Berlin, 1894

At the 1884 Berlin Congo conference, attended by all major powers of the day, European states divided Africa into areas of influence which they would control. Germany controlled colonies in the African Great Lakes region and West Africa, from which numerous Africans migrated to Germany for the first time. Germany appointed indigenous specialists for the colonial administration and economy, and many young Africans went to Germany to be educated. Some received higher education at German schools and universities, but the majority were trained at mission training and colonial training centers as officers or domestic mission teachers. Africans frequently served as interpreters for African languages at German-Africa research centers, and with the colonial administration. Others migrated to Germany as former members of the German protection troops, the Askari.

The Afrikanisches Viertel in Berlin is also a legacy of the colonial period, with a number of streets and squares named after countries and locations tied to the German colonial empire. It is now home to a substantial portion of Berlin's residents of African heritage.

Interracial couples in the colonies were subjected to strong pressure in a campaign against miscegenation, which included invalidation of marriages, declaring the mixed-race children illegitimate, and stripping them of German citizenship. During extermination of the Nama people in 1907 by Germany, the German director for colonial affairs, Bernhard Dernburg, stated that "some native tribes, just like some animals, must be destroyed".

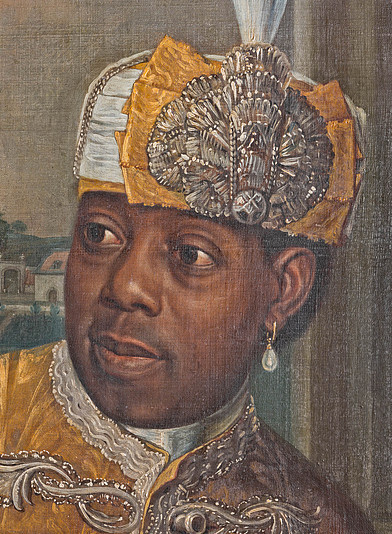
Afro-German Ignatius Fortuna († 1789), Kammermohr

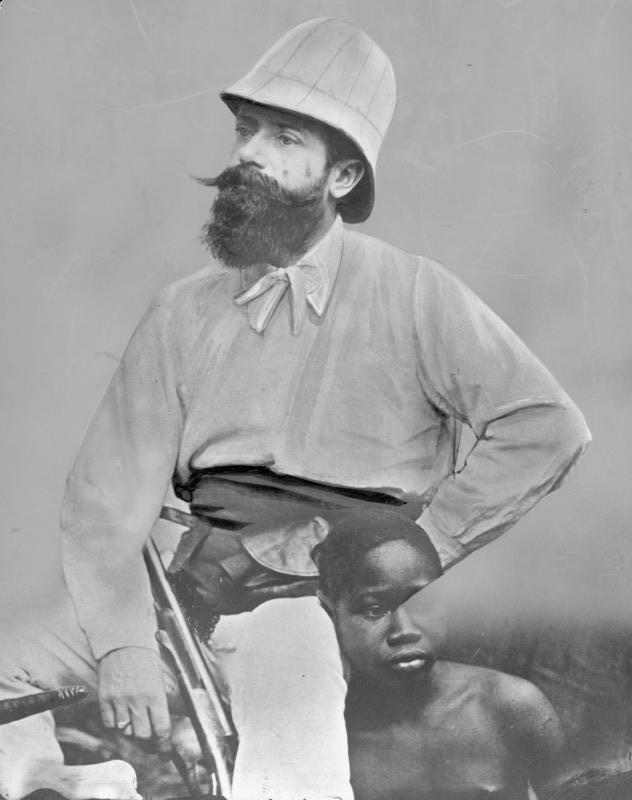
German colonial adventurer Ernst Henrici, c. 1880

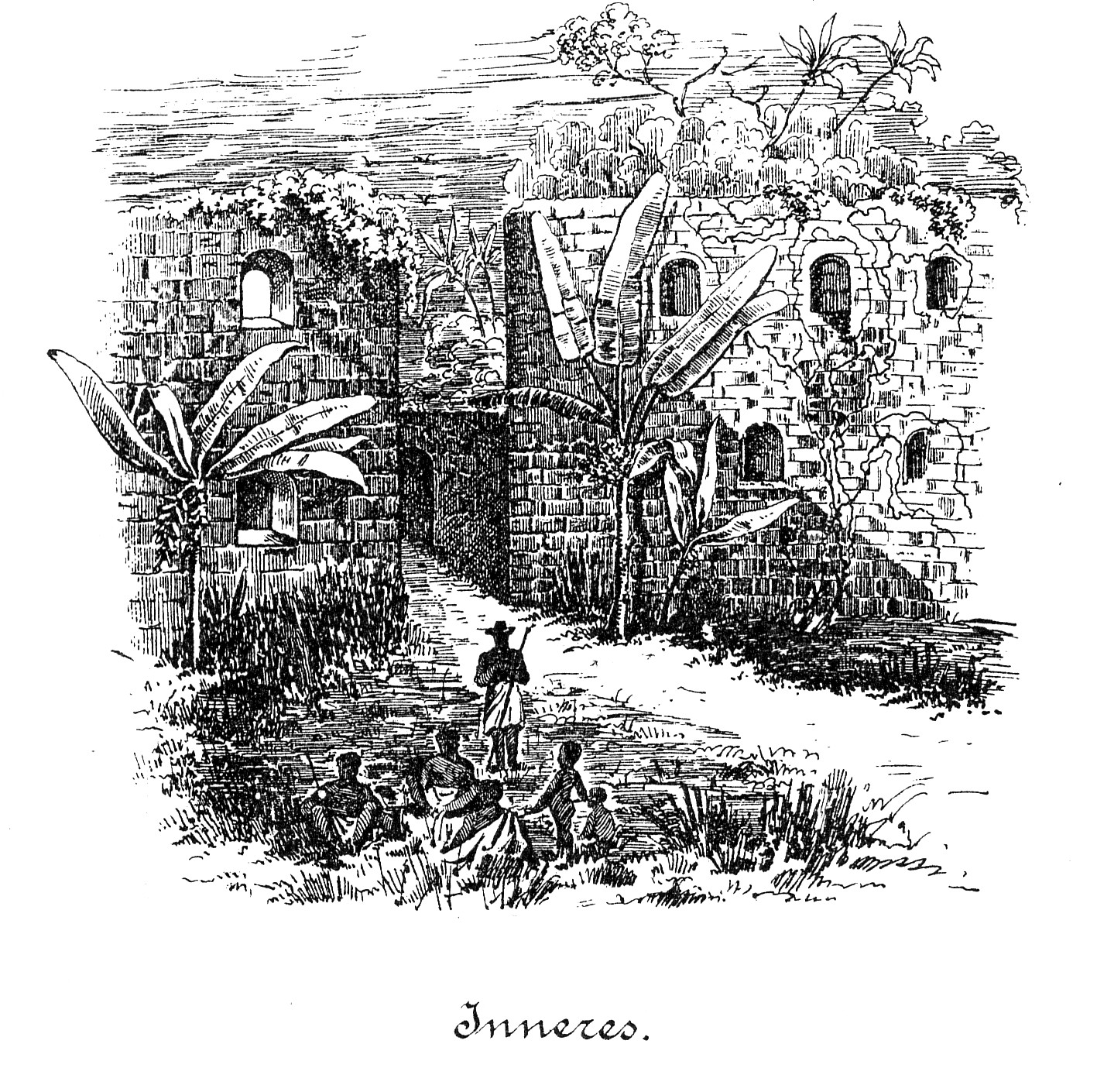
Inside Brandenburger Gold Coast, February 1884

==== Weimar Republic ====
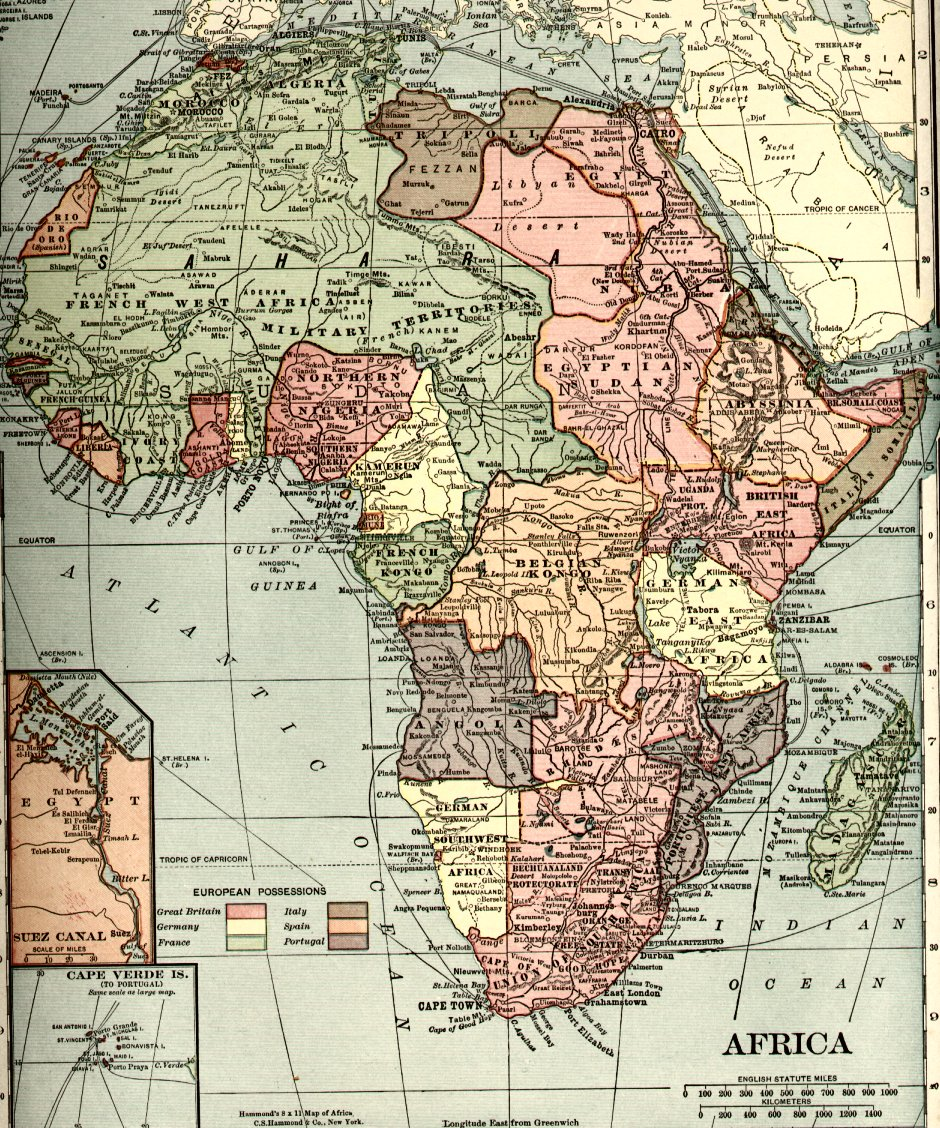
Map of Africa in 1914 with regions colonized by Germany shown in yellow.

In the course of World War I, the Belgians, British and French took control of Germany's colonies in Africa. The situation for the African colonials in Germany changed in various ways. For example, Africans who possessed a colonial German identification card had a status entitling them to treatment as "members of the former protectorates". After the Treaty of Versailles (1919), the Africans were encouraged to become citizens of their respective mandate countries, but most preferred to stay where they were. In numerous petitions (well documented for German Togoland by P. Sebald and for Cameroon by A. Rüger), they tried to inform the German public about the conditions in the colonies, and continued to request German help and support.

Africans founded the bilingual periodical that was published in German and Duala: Elolombe ya Cameroon (Sun of Cameroon). A political group of Black Germans established the German branch of the Paris-based human-rights organization, Ligue de défense de la race nègre (Eng: League for the Defense of the Negro Race) as the Liga zur Verteidigung der Negerrasse, on September 17, 1929.

==== Nazi Germany ====
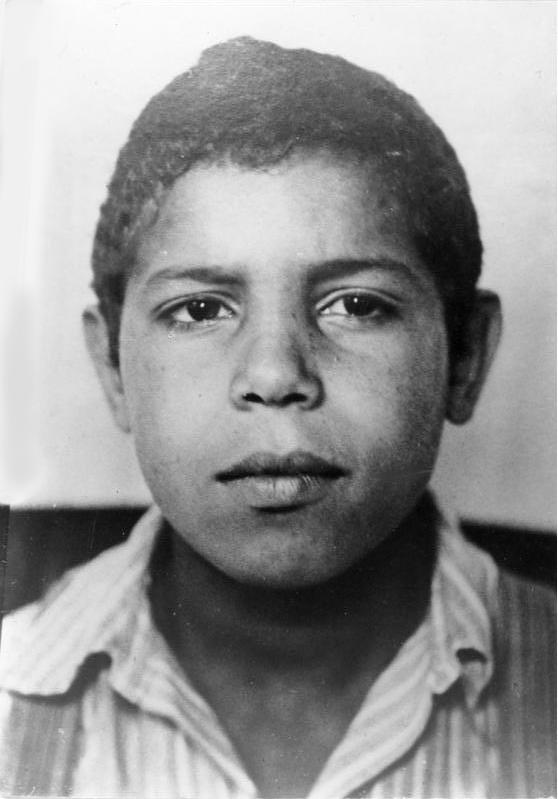
Young Rhinelander who was classified as a bastard and hereditarily unfit under the Nazi regime

The conditions for Afro-Germans in Germany grew worse during the Nazi period. Naturalized Afro-Germans lost their passports. Working conditions and travel were made extremely difficult for Afro-German musicians, variety, circus or film professionals. Because of Nazi policies, employers were unable to retain or hire Afro-German employees.

Afro-Germans in Germany were socially isolated and forbidden to have sexual relations and marriages with Aryans by the Nuremberg Laws. In continued discrimination directed at the so-called Rhineland bastards, Nazi officials subjected some 500 Afro-German children in the Rhineland to forced sterilization. Afro-Germans were considered "enemies of the race-based state", along with Jews and Roma. The Nazis originally sought to rid the German state of Jews and Romani by means of deportation (and later extermination), while Afro-Germans were to be segregated and eventually exterminated through compulsory sterilization.

Some Black Germans who lived through this period later wrote about their experiences. In 1999 Hans Massaquoi published Destined to Witness about his life in Germany under Nazi rule, and in 2013 Theodor Wonja Michael, who was also the main witness in the documentary film Pages in the Factory of Dreams, published his autobiography, Deutsch Sein und Schwarz dazu.

=== Since 1945 ===
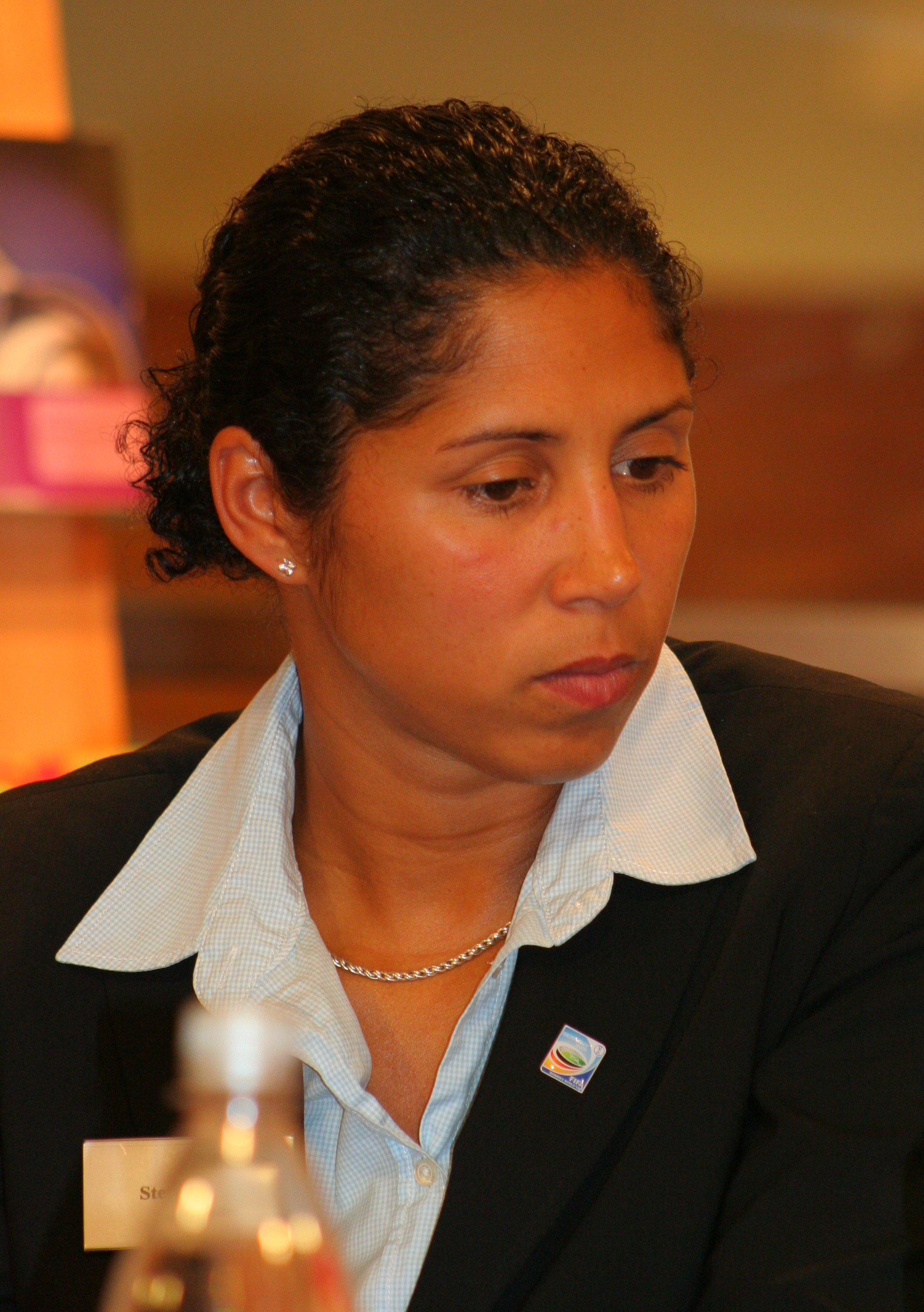
Steffi Jones, President of the Organizing Committee of the 2011 FIFA Women's World Cup and head coach of the Germany women's national football team from 2016 to 2018

The end of World War II brought Allied occupation forces into Germany. American, British and French forces included numerous soldiers of African American, Afro-Caribbean or African descent, and some of them fathered children with ethnic German women. At the time, these armed forces generally maintained non-fraternization rules and discouraged civilian-soldier marriages. Around 5,000 of these biracial Afro-German children were born after the war by 1955. Most single ethnic German mothers kept their "brown babies", but thousands were adopted by American families and grew up in the United States. Often they did not learn their full ancestry until reaching adulthood.

Until the end of the Cold War, the United States kept more than 100,000 U.S. soldiers stationed on German soil. During their stay, these men established their lives in Germany. They often brought families with them or founded new ones with ethnic German wives and children. The federal government of West Germany pursued a policy of isolating or removing from Germany those children that it described as "mixed-race negro children".

Audre Lorde, Black American writer and activist, spent the years from 1984 to 1992 teaching at the Free University of Berlin. During her time in Germany, often called "The Berlin Years," she helped push the coining of the term "Afro-German" into a movement that addressed the intersectionality of race, gender, and sexual orientation. She encouraged Black German women such as May Ayim and Ika Hügel-Marshall to write and publish poems and autobiographies as a means of gaining visibility. She pursued intersectional global feminism and acted as an advocate for that movement in Germany.

==== Immigration ====
Since 1981, Germany has seen immigration from African countries, mostly Nigeria, Eritrea and Ghana, who were seeking political asylum, work or studies in German universities.

Below are the largest (Sub-Saharan) African groups in Germany.

| Country of birth | Immigrants in Germany (2021 Census) |
|---|---|
| Nigeria | 83,000 |
| Eritrea | 75,000 |
| Ghana | 66,000 |
| Cameroon | 41,000 |
| South Africa | 34,000 |
| Ethiopia | 27,000 |
| Kenya | 22,000 |
| Togo | 20,000 |
| Gambia | 16,000 |
| Angola | 15,000 |
| Guinea | 17,000 |
| Senegal | 15,000 |
| Congo-Kinshasa | 14,000 |
| Congo-Brazzaville | 10,000 |
| Uganda | 6,500 |
| Ivory Coast | 6,000 |
| Sudan | 5,000 |
| Rwanda | 5,000 |
| Sierra Leone | 4,000 |
| Tanzania | 4,100 |
| Mali | 4,000 |
| Zimbabwe | 3,715 |
| Benin | 3,000 |
| Burkina Faso | 2,100 |
| Mozambique | 2,100 |
| Liberia | 2,000 |
| Burundi | 1,000 |
| Zambia | 1,000 |

== Racism and social status ==
A survey was conducted by the European Union Agency for Fundamental Rights, surveying over 16,000 immigrants, including over 6,700 people born in sub-Saharan Africa. According to the survey, the highest rate of reported discrimination in the last years was in German-speaking Europe, particularly Germany — with 54% reporting having experienced racist harassment, well above the EU average of 30%.

== Afro-Germans in literature ==
Coat of arms of Coburg, 1493, depicting Saint Maurice

- Edugyan, Esi (2011). Half Blood Blues. Serpent's Tail. p. 343. Novel about a multiracial jazz group in Nazi Germany. The band's young trumpeter is a Rhineland Bastard who eventually is taken by the Nazis, while other members of the band are African Americans.
- Jones, Gayl (1998). The Healing. Boston: Beacon Press. ISBN 978-0-8070-6314-9. Novel about a faith healer and rock band manager, featuring an Afro-German character, Josef Ehelich von Fremd, an affluent fellow who works in arbitrage and owns fine racehorses.
- Massaquoi, Hans J. (1999). Destined to Witness: Growing Up Black in Nazi Germany. W. Morrow. ISBN 978-0060959616. An autobiography by Hans J. Massaquoi, born in Hamburg, Germany, to a German mother and a Liberian father of Vai ethnicity, the grandson of Momulu Massaquoi.
- Ika Hügel-Marshall. (2008) Marshall wrote an autobiography "Daheim unterwegs: Ein deutsches Leben", the English translation of which is entitled "Invisible Woman: Growing up Black in Germany". She details her life experiences growing up as an "occupation baby" and the struggle to find her identity as she grows up. Marshall details how the society she grew up in taught her to hate her complexion and how meeting her father, a black man, instilled a renewed pride in her heritage. The autobiography culminates in the struggle to find information on her father in the United States and finally getting to meet her American family.
- Ijoma Mangold (born 1971). Journalist and literary critic Mangold wrote his autobiography, published in English translation in 2021 as The German Crocodile: A literary memoir about growing up in Germany in the 1970s.

== Afro-German political groups ==
=== Initiative of Black People (Initiative Schwarzer Deutscher) ===
- This initiative created a political community that offers support for black people in Germany. Its main goals are to give people a chance to have their voices heard by each other and by those who do not share the same experiences. In the space provided by ISD gatherings, Afro-Germans are able to connect with people who might be in similar situations and who can offer them support.
- Teachings from the ISD emphasise the role of history in understanding current politics. This is because of the belief that Germany has committed numerous atrocities in the past (notably in South-West Africa), but has no intentions of paying reparations to communities that still suffer today. The ISD notes that the importance of paying these reparations are for the structural changes made to a broken, discriminatory system.
- The ISD combats discrimination in Germany through active support, campaigning through the media, and outreach to the government.

== Notable Afro-Germans in contemporary Germany ==
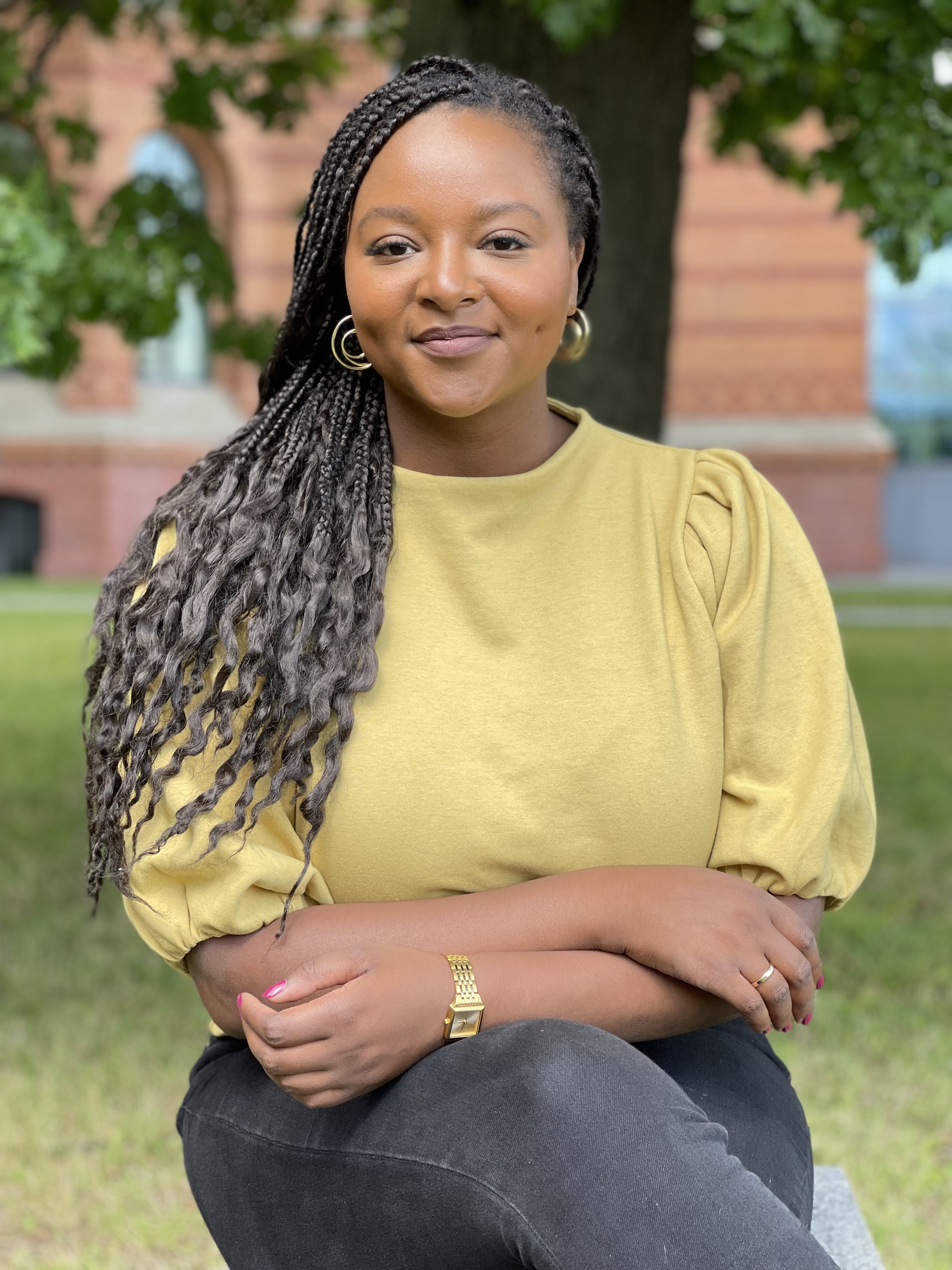
Aminata Touré, minister in the state government of Schleswig-Holstein.

=== Politics and social life ===
- Joe Chialo (born 1970), Berlin State Minister (Senator) for Culture and Social Cohesion
- Karamba Diaby (born 1961), Afro-German politician, member of the Bundestag
- John Ehret (born 1971), Germany's first Afro-German mayor
- Pierrette Herzberger-Fofana (born 1949), only black MEP to represent Germany following the 2019 European elections
- Charles M. Huber (born 1956), Afro-German politician and former actor, member of the Bundestag
- Ika Hügel-Marshall (1947–2022), wrote about growing up in postwar Germany
- Bärbel Kampmann (1946–1999), anti-racist activist and writer
- Hans Massaquoi (1926–2013), journalist, wrote about his childhood in Nazi Germany
- Awet Tesfaiesus, member of the Bundestag
- Aminata Touré (born 1992), Minister of Social Affairs, Youth, Family, Senior Citizens, Integration and Equality of the State of Schleswig-Holstein
- Harald Weyel, politician, member of the Bundestag
- Armand Zorn, member of the Bundestag

=== Art, culture and music ===
The cultural life of Afro-Germans is marked by great variety and complexity. With the emergence of MTV and Viva, the popularity of American pop culture promoted Afro-German representation in German media and culture.

May Ayim (1960-1996), was an Afro-German poet, educator and activist. She was co-editor of the book Farbe bekennen, whose English translation was published as Showing Our Colors: Afro-German Women Speak Out.

Notable Afro-German musicians include:

- Adé Bantu (born 1971)
- Afrob (born 1977)
- Tayo Awosusi-Onutor (born 1978)
- Ayọ (born 1980)
- Bibi Bourelly
- B-Tight (born 1979)
- Carlprit (born 1986)
- Cassandra Steen (born 1980)
- Denyo (born 1977)
- Deso Dogg (1975-2018)
- D-Flame (born 1971)
- Francisca Urio (born 1981)
- Haddaway (born 1965)
- Harris (born 1976)
- Jessica Wahls (born 1977)
- Jonesmann (born 1979)
- Joy Denalane (born 1973)
- U-Jean
- Kalusha (born 1963)
- KeyLiza (born 1990)
- Lou Bega (born 1975)
- Luciano (born 1994)
- Mamadee (born 1979)
- Mark Medlock (born 1978)
- Meshell Ndegeocello (born 1968)
- Mortel (born 1991)
- Nana (born 1968)
- Nneka (born 1980)
- Nura (born 1988)
- Patrice Bart-Williams (born 1979)
- Ramona Wulf (born 1954)
- Raptile (born 1976)
- Roberto Blanco (born 1937)
- Rob Pilatus (1965-1998)
- Samy Deluxe (born 1977)
- Serious Klein (born 1991)
- Taktloss (born 1975)
- Tarek Ebéné (born 1986)
- Teddy Teclebrhan (born 1983)
- Tic Tac Toe

=== Film and television ===
Logo of SFD - Schwarze Filmschaffende in Deutschland

SFD - Schwarze Filmschaffende in Deutschland (Black Filmmakers in Germany) is a professional association based in Berlin for film directors, producers, screenwriters, and actors who are Afro-Germans or of Black African origin and living in Germany. They have organized the "New Perspectives" series at the Berlin International Film Festival.

Notable Afro-Germans in film and television include:

- Louis Brody (1892–1951)
- Adunni Ade (born 1970)
- Araba Walton (born 1975)
- Arabella Kiesbauer (born 1969)
- Bayume Mohamed Husen (1904–1944)
- Boris Kodjoe (born 1973)
- Carol Campbell (born 1966)
- Elfie Fiegert (born 1946)
- Florence Kasumba (born 1976)
- Günther Kaufmann (1947–2012)
- Ijoma Mangold (1971)
- Leila Negra (1930–2025)
- Mo Asumang (born 1963)
- Mola Adebisi (born 1973)
- Motsi Mabuse (born 1981)
- Nisma Cherrat (born 1969)
- Nadia Hilker (born 1988)
- Roberto Blanco (born 1937)
- Ruby Commey (born 1991)
- Zazie Beetz (born 1991)

=== Sport ===
- Ariel Hukporti
- Ayodele Adetula
- Baboucarr Gaye
- Cebio Soukou
- Jeremy Toljan
- Gedion Zelalem
- Leon Balogun
- Richard Adjei (1983–2020), member of the German bobsleigh team
- Dennis Aogo (born 1987), footballer
- Samsondin Ouro
- Stephan Ambrosius
- Nicole Anyomi, footballer
- Stephen Arigbabu (born 1972), basketball coach
- Gerald Asamoah (born 1978), footballer
- Noahkai Banks (born 2006), footballer
- Bienvenue Basala-Mazana (born 1992), footballer
- Collin Benjamin (born 1978), footballer
- Yann Aurel Bisseck (born 2000), footballer
- Jérôme Boateng (born 1988), footballer
- Kevin Prince Boateng (born 1987), footballer
- Isaac Bonga (born 1999), basketball player
- John Brooks (born 1993), footballer
- Nathaniel Brown (born 2003), footballer
- Francis Bugri (born 1980), footballer
- Cacau (born 1981), footballer
- Timothy Chandler (born 1990), footballer
- Marvin Compper (born 1985), footballer
- Gia Corley, footballer
- Bakary Diakite (born 1980), footballer
- Chinedu Ede, footballer
- Florence Ekpo-Umoh, athlete
- Matthias Fahrig, athlete
- Charles Friedek, athlete
- Kamghe Gaba, athlete
- Robert Garrett, basketball player
- Stefano Garris, basketball player
- Serge Gnabry, footballer
- Julian Green, footballer
- Demond Greene, basketball player
- Leon Guwara, footballer
- Misan Haldin, basketball player
- Elias Harris, basketball player
- Isaiah Hartenstein, basketball player
- Jimmy Hartwig, footballer
- Benjamin Henrichs, footballer
- Raphael Holzdeppe, pole vaulter
- Ismail Jakobs, footballer
- Fabian Johnson, footballer
- Jermaine Jones, footballer
- Steffi Jones, footballer
- Gideon Jung, footballer
- Thilo Kehrer, footballer
- Alex King, basketball player
- Linda Kisabaka, athlete
- Erwin Kostedde, footballer
- Mohammed Lartey, footballer
- Maodo Lô, basketball player
- Da Mack, professional wrestler
- Streli Mamba, footballer
- Andrej Mangold, basketball player
- Ousman Manneh, footballer
- Shekiera Martinez, footballer
- David McCray, basketball player
- Amewu Mensah, athlete
- Malaika Mihambo, athlete
- Youssoufa Moukoko, footballer
- Jean-Claude Mpassy, footballer
- Hany Mukhtar, footballer
- Malik Müller, basketball player
- Sabrina Mulrain, athlete
- Jamal Musiala, footballer
- Alexandra Ndolo, German-Kenyan épée fencer
- David Odonkor, footballer
- Akwasi Oduro, footballer
- Ademola Okulaja, basketball player
- Navina Omilade, footballer
- Prince Owusu, footballer
- Patrick Owomoyela, footballer
- Alexis Peterson, basketball player
- Kofi Amoah Prah, athlete
- Shary Reeves, footballer and TV presenter
- Antonio Rüdiger, footballer
- Nyara Sabally, basketball player
- Satou Sabally, basketball player
- Joshiko Saibou, basketball player
- Sidney Sam, footballer
- Leroy Sané, footballer
- Célia Šašić, footballer
- Kingsley Schindler, footballer
- Dennis Schröder, basketball player
- Leyti Seck, alpine skier
- Davie Selke, footballer
- Lennard Sowah, footballer
- Richard Sukuta-Pasu, footballer
- Robin Szolkowy, figure skater
- Jonathan Tah, footballer
- Malick Thiaw, footballer
- Johannes Thiemann, basketball player
- Assimiou Touré, footballer
- Akeem Vargas, basketball player
- Pascal Wehrlein, racing driver
- Reinhold Yabo, footballer
- John Yeboah, footballer
- Cora Zicai, footballer
- Joseph Boyamba, footballer
- Michael Zimmer, footballer
- Nyara Sabally, basketball player
- Ella Touon
- Robert Glatzel
- Ansgar Knauff
- Jesaja Herrmann
- Noahkai Banks
- Karim Guédé
- Stanley Ratifo
- Tolani Omotola
- Faride Alidou
- Josha Vagnoman
- Louis Samson
- Malick Thiaw
- Malik Tillman
- Marian Sarr
- Sanoussy Ba
- Noah Atubolu
- Timothy Tillman
- Elias Kachunga
- Felix Nmecha
- Lukas Nmecha
- Maduka Okoye
- Marcel Appiah
- Ransford-Yeboah Königsdörffer
- Jordan Torunarigha

== See also ==
- Demographics of Germany
- Afro-European
- Racism in Germany
