= Katharina Oguntoye =

Afro-German writer, historian, activist and poet

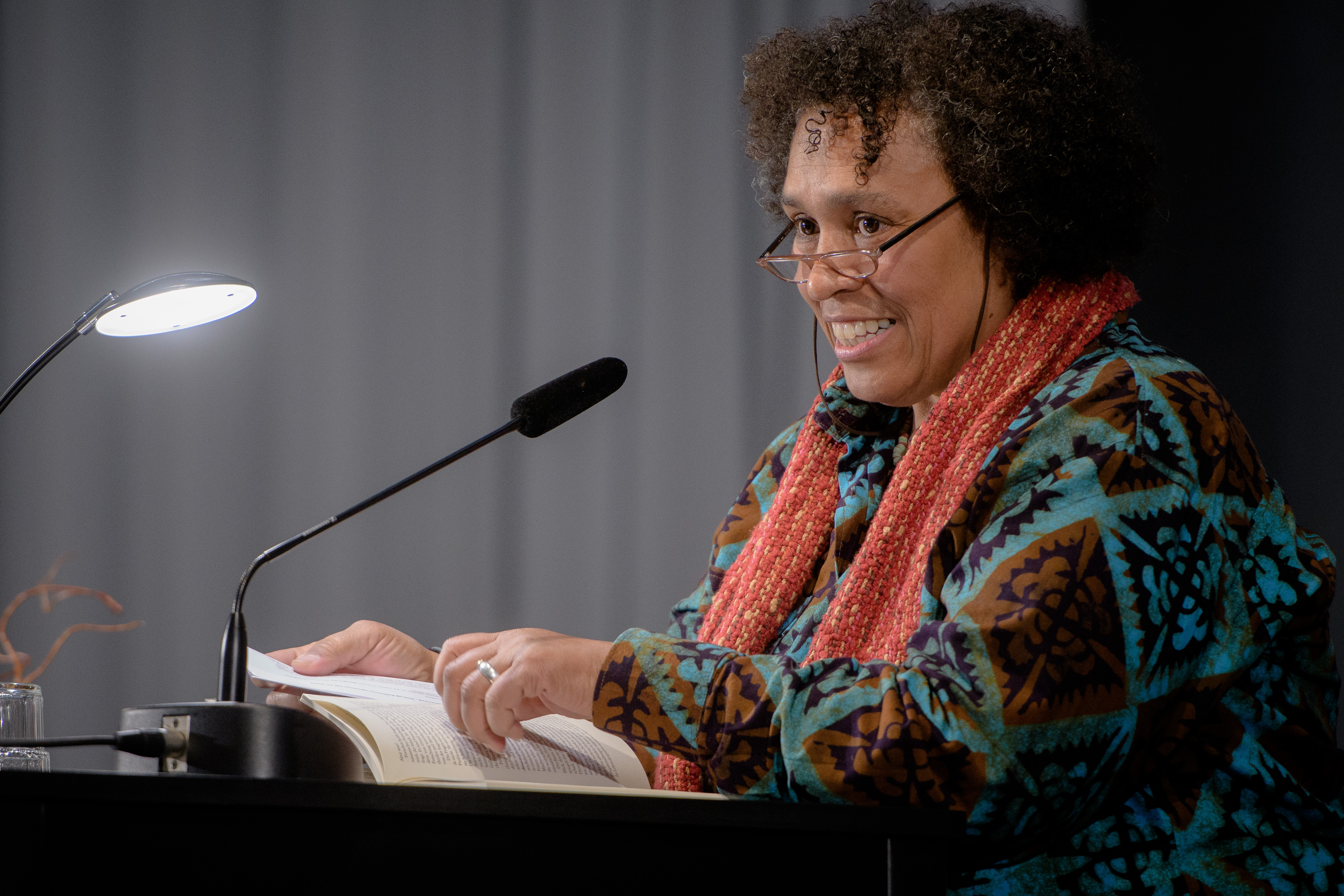
- Born: January 1959 (age 67); Zwickau
- Writing career
- Genre: poetry
- Literary movement: Afro-German

Katharina Oguntoye (born January 1959 in Zwickau, East Germany) is an Afro-German writer, historian, activist, and poet. She founded the nonprofit intercultural association Joliba in Germany and is perhaps best known for co-editing the book Farbe bekennen with May Ayim (then May Opitz) and Dagmar Schultz. The English translation of this book was entitled Showing Our Colors: Afro-German Women Speak Out. Oguntoye has played an important role in the Afro-German Movement.

== Life ==
Katharina Oguntoye grew up in Leipzig, Heidelberg and in Nigeria. According to statements from Oguntoye her mother met her father at the University of Leipzig, where he was studying with the help of a scholarship from the German Democratic Republic. Oguntoye’s father returned to Nigeria in 1965 to take up a professorship. Her mother joined him a year later with Oguntoye and her younger brother and they lived on the university campus. Oguntoye got to know her father’s side of the family there. Two years later, in 1967, the Biafran War broke out so Oguntoye returned with her mother to her aunt’s hometown of Heidelberg in Germany. Oguntoye’s brother stayed with their father.

Oguntoye describes her youth in Heidelberg as not easy as few other Afro-Germans lived there. Her previous time in Nigeria was essential for her to distinguish between foreign external ascriptions and her own images. At the same time, Oguntoye began to be politically engaged in the emerging environmental movement, and later also in the women’s movement.

Katharina Oguntoye moved to Berlin in 1982 to get her Abitur (the high school diploma in Germany qualifying students for university) at the Kreuzberg School for Adult Education. She was the only black person in her class in the 1980s. She says at the same time the setting of a self-organized school gave her the opportunity to empower herself and become visible in mixed-gendered discussions with other women. It was also during this time that she came out as lesbian.

She is in a civil union with her life partner, author and translator, Carolyn Gammon.

=== Work and career ===
In 1984 Oguntoye attended seminars from the American poet and activist Audre Lorde who, amongst other things, was a visiting lecturer at Freie Universität Berlin. Lorde was offered to publish a book with Orlanda Publishing, but instead asked May Ayim, then 22, and Oguntoye, 24, to publish a work about and for Afro-Germans in Germany: Stellt euch einander und der Welt vor [Introduce Yourselves to Each Other and the World]. In 1986 Farbe bekennen [Showing our Colors] was published by Oguntoye, Ayim and Dagmar Schultz.

Farbe Bekennen was the first book to describe racist everyday encounters of Afro-Germans in Germany. The book is said to be (one of) the reason(s) of a politicization of the Afro-German movement. For the first time, black people in Germany came into contact with each other and became politicized.

Contrary to today, there was little acknowledgement from white feministic communities, said journalist Laura Freisberg during a broadcast by BR-Zündfunk. In a 2019 interview with L-Mag, Oguntoye recalled, “Our coming out as black Germans made white feminists reflect more and realize: These are privileges. White Germans had the ‘check-card of privileges’: right to work, right to settle, freedom of movement. We as Afro-Germans have these rights to a certain extent with our German passports, but we are continuously denied them.”

Oguntoye began studying history at the Technical University in 1985. Her thesis, which was published in 1997 with the title, “Eine Afro-Deutsche Geschichte: Zur Lebensituation von Afrikanern und Afro-Deutschen in Deutschland von 1884 to 1950” (An Afro-German Story: About the Living Situations of Africans and Afro-Germans in Germany from 1884 to 1950), was again published in a new edition in 2020 by the Orlanda Publishing. In this historic work she focused on black people in Germany with an emphasis on the realities of life and the perspective of Africans and Afro-Germans beyond the perspective of the German majority.

=== Political engagement ===
Oguntoye was a co-founder of the Initiative Schwarze Menschen in Deutschland (ISD) [Initiative of black people in Germany] and the Afro-German women’s group ADEFRA. She also founded the intercultural network Joliba e. V. in 1997 which primarily offers services to families of African, Afro-German and African American descent. In addition to children’s festivals and parent-child groups, the association organizes exhibitions, readings and seminars. Oguntoye explains her motivation for her engagement above all else with the fact that black people in Germany continue to be invisible and don’t have equal rights. She has also led the association as project manager and managing director since its founding.

=== Awards ===
2020 Prize for Lesbian Visibility in the State of Berlin

=== Selected works ===
- Farbe Bekennen. Afro-deutsche auf den Spuren ihre Geschichte [Showing our Colors: Afro-German Women Speak Out] (with May Opitz/Ayim and Dagmar Schultz). Orlanda Frauenverlag, Berlin 1986, ISBN 3-922166-21-0.
  - New edition with preface from Katharina Oguntoye in Orlanda Verlag, Berlin 2020, ISBN 978-3944666204
- Showing Our Colors: Afro-German Women Speak Out. University of Massachusetts Press, Amherst 1991, ISBN 978-0870237591
- Parallelität und Balance/Ausgleich. Über die Konflikte zwischen der schwarzen und der weißen Frauen bewegung [Parallelism and Balance/Equalization: on the Conflicts between the black and white Women’s Movements] Self-published, document: 9. Berliner Lebenswoche 1993. Die Herausforderung annehmen – Hauptthema: Rassismus (Accepting the Challenge – Main Topic: Racism), 1993, Pg. 44-48.
- "Sozialisationseinflüsse und Lebenssituation von afro-deutschen Frauen/Lesben" ["Socialization Influences and Life Situation of Afro-German Women/Lesbians"]. In: Senatsverwaltung für Jugend und Familie (Hrsg.): Pädagogischer Kongreß: Lebensformen und Sexualität. Was heißt hier normal? Lesbisch – schwul – heterosexuell. [Senate Department for Youth and Family (ed.): Pedagogical Conference: Lifestyles and Sexuality. What does normal mean? Lesbian –Gay –Straight] Series: Dokumente lesbisch-schwuler Emanzipation des Referats für gleichgeschlechtliche Lebensweisen [Documents of Lesbian-Gay Emancipation of the Department for Same-Sex Lifestyles] Nr. 8, Berlin 1993, S. 205–208.
- Katharina Oguntoye: Eine afro-deutsche Geschichte: Zur Lebenssituation von Afrikanern und Afro-Deutschen in Deutschland von 1884 bis 1950. (An Afro-German Story: About the Living Situations of Africans and Afro-Germans in Germany from 1884 to 1950) Verlag Christine Hoffmann, Berlin 1997, ISBN 3-929120-08-9
  - New edition: Schwarze Wurzeln: Afro-deutsche Familiengeschichten von 1884 bis 1950 [Black Roots: Afro-German Family Stories from 1884 to 1950]. Orlanda Verlag, Berlin 2020, ISBN 978-3944666624
- "Afrikanische Zuwanderung nach Deutschland zwischen 1884 und 1945" ["African immigration to Germany between 1884 and 1945"] In: Bundeszentrale für politische Bildung from 30. Juli 2004.
- "Mein Coming-out als Schwarze Lesbe in Deutschland" ["My Coming Out as a Black Lesbian in Germany"]. In: Gabriele Dennert, Christiane Leidinger, Franziska Rauchut (eds.) Bewegung bleiben. 100 Jahre Politik, Kultur und Geschichte von Lesben [Keeping Moving. 100 Years of Lesbian Politics, Culture and History]. Querverlag, Berlin 2007, ISBN 978-3-89656-148-0, Pg. 160–163.
- "Prekäre Subjekte. Der Kolonialismus und seine Folgen – 125 Jahre nach der Berliner Afrika-Konferenz" ["Precarious Subjects: Colonialism and its Consequences – 125 Years after the Berlin Conference on Africa"]. In: INKOTA-Brief 149, September 2009.
- Contribution in: Sara Lennox: Remapping Black Germany. New Perspectives on Afro-German History, Politics, and Culture. University of Massachusetts Press, Amherst 2016, ISBN 978-1-62534-231-7.
