= Ika Hügel-Marshall =

German writer and activist (1947–2022)

- Born: Erika Hügel-Marshall; 13 March 1947; Roth, Bavaria, Germany
- Died: 21 April 2022 (aged 75); Berlin
- Occupations: Author; civil rights activist
- Notable work: Daheim unterwegs (Invisible Woman)
- Spouse: Dagmar Schultz
- Website: ika-huegel-marshall.com

Erika "Ika" Hügel-Marshall (13 March 1947 – 21 April 2022) was a German author and activist. She was active in the Afro-German women's movement organization ADEFRA (Afro-Deutsche Frauen). Her autobiography, Daheim unterwegs. Ein deutsches Leben (published in English as Invisible Woman: Growing up Black in Germany), discusses racism in Germany and her search for a family identity. She was influenced by and praised the work of her friend, American activist Audre Lorde. She and her partner Dagmar Schultz worked with Lorde.

Hügel-Marshall was born to a German mother and African-American father, whom she did not meet until she was 46. She experienced severe racism as a child, especially during her time in an orphanage. She studied well and helped to modernize a children's home in Frankfurt am Main. In the 1980s she helped establish the Afro-Deutsch movement and became interested in Lorde's work. Daheim unterwegs was published in 1998 and has been described as highlighting issues within German racism. She has since given talks and readings, based on the autobiography, at universities and festivals.

== Biography ==
=== Childhood ===
Erika Hügel-Marshall was born on 13 March 1947, the child of a Bavarian woman and an African-American soldier, Eddie Marshall, who returned to the US before her birth. Her parents had met just after the end of World War II, after a relaxation of laws forbidding military personnel from interacting with civilians. According to her, black soldiers treated native German children well, distributing food and clothing, but her parents generally met in secret due to racist remarks from others. In November 1946 her father returned to the US after an illness. By that time, both of them knew that her mother was pregnant, but she did not know he was leaving until after he was already gone. A year after Ika's birth, her mother married a German man, and a half-sister was born the following year. Her mother and grandmother loved her and treated her like any other child, despite social disapproval. She was close to her half-sister, but her step-father was distant toward her.

Despite her recollections of a pleasant early childhood, Hügel-Marshall was singled out for her skin colour. Growing up, she faced constant racism and was referred to by the local community as a Negermischling. In 1952, when she was ready to start school, her mother was forced by social services to send her to the orphanage God's Little Cabin Children's Home. She lived there for the rest of her childhood, despite promises that it was only temporary, that she would only be there for six weeks. At the home, she endured mental and physical abuse from both adults and children. This included being shouted at to stop crying for her mother, being force-fed her own vomit, and undergoing an exorcism, during which she was blindfolded and forced to repeat such phrases as "Satan, I cast you out" and "Lord Jesus, purify my black soul." She was locked in a dark room and held there against her will. At this point in Hügel-Marshall's childhood she had "no greater desire than to be white" and she was "riddled with guilt" for being black, due to the fact that the nuns told her that being black placed sin in her soul. She was allowed to go home for summer vacations; she never told her family about her bad experiences at the children's home.

Hügel-Marshall performed well at school, often finishing top of the class, and taught herself to swim, but was still patronised by the nuns teaching her, who said "we never expected much from you". Teachers told her she would never amount to anything: she would be promiscuous, have children out of wedlock, become an alcoholic, and do no better than find a job in childcare. She begged to go to a school where she could get higher education and become a teacher, but instead she was transferred to a boarding school where she was taught how to work with young children. After two years of training she was unable to find employment, although her white roommate immediately found a position.

=== Adulthood ===
Hügel-Marshall continued to study and achieved a license in child education and welfare. She then found work in a children's home in Frankfurt am Main, where she worked for twelve years. The home reminded her of the degrading orphanage she had been sent to and seemed more like a detention center than a school. Working with the other teachers, and over the opposition of the school's management, she was able to make substantial changes and to modernize it during her time there. While working there, she completed a degree in social work and pedagogy.

In Frankfurt she met and married an ethnic German man named Alexander. Both of their families attended the wedding, but several incidents illustrated once again how German society treated her as "invisible". When she and Alexander went to get their marriage license, the registrar greeted Alexander, wrote down his name, and then asked "Where is the bride?" As they were descending the courthouse steps after their wedding, a passerby offered wedding congratulations to the maid of honor. She ignored the incidents even though "I am troubled by this continual need to point out to others that it is I who am getting married." After six years she and Alexander divorced.

Hügel-Marshall became active in the women's rights movement while in Frankfurt. But even among her feminist activist colleagues she felt isolated, because she was the only black woman there. She had never met another black German, and from her years in the children's home she had learned to think of blacks (including herself) as inferior and immoral. Years later she commented that "the most disastrous thing I learned at the home was self-hatred." In 1986, she attended a meeting of Afro-Germans; she was 39 years old and it was the first time she had ever seen "a black face that wasn't my own." She was empowered by the sense of community and became an activist for Afro-Germans, studying their history and asserting their legitimacy in a society that still assumed that all Germans must be white.

In 1965 she attempted to find her father, and wrote him a letter explaining her situation, but the letter was returned marked "insufficient address". She never gave up the hope of finding him and when, in 1990, she moved to Berlin, she met people who offered to help her trace her father and that side of her family. In 1993, at the age of 46, she finally met her father and his large American family in Chicago, where she was welcomed and accepted as an equal. Hügel-Marshall later said "here is my journey's end", referring to the meeting, adding "I knew my survival in a white racist society was not for nothing". He died the following year.

Hügel-Marshall has taught gender studies and psychological counseling in Berlin, having gained a degree in social pedagogics. She worked as a psychotherapist with an inter-cultural focus, and was also an artist who specialized in color drawings and wood sculpture. She died suddenly and unexpectedly on 21 April 2022, aged 75.

== Activism ==
In 1986, Hügel-Marshall became active in the Afro-German women's movement ADEFRA. "ADEFRA" is short for "afrodeutsche Frauen" (Afro-German Women). It uses literature and the media to call attention to the status of Afro-Germans as "statistically invisible and yet uncomfortably conspicious. [sic] " She and other German-born, German-speaking people with African ancestry were commonly not accepted as German because of their skin colour. The Afro-German movement, founded at the same time as the Initiative of Black Germans (ISD; Initiative Schwarze Deutsche), used community building "to resist marginalization and discrimination, to gain social acceptance, and to construct a cultural identity for themselves."

Hügel-Marshall's work has been influenced by American civil rights activist Audre Lorde. Lorde was living in Germany when ADEFRA was founded, and encouraged Afro-Germans to come together and discuss their lives. She encouraged them to write their autobiographies, which Hügel-Marshall did. She and Lorde first met in 1987, by which time Hügel-Marshall had read substantial material of Lorde's work and was excited that they would meet. Hügel-Marshall is a co-author of the documentary film "Audre Lorde – The Berlin Years 1984 to 1992". In 2012, she attended the film's premiere at the Audre Lorde Legacy Cultural Festival in Chicago, together with her partner, filmmaker Dagmar Schultz. Hügel-Marshall said she had a positive relationship with Chicago, as it was here she found her father.

== Autobiography ==
In 1998 Hügel-Marshall published her autobiography, Daheim unterwegs: Ein deutsches Leben, chronicling her experiences surviving as a black woman in Germany. Daheim means "at home" while unterwegs means "on the way" or "in transit"; the combination is a deliberate oxymoron suggesting someone seeking a home in her own country. The English translation of the book, published in 2001 by Continuum International Publishers, is titled Invisible Woman: Growing Up Black in Germany; an annotated English version was published by Peter Lang Publishing in 2008. The book explores the relationship with her father and with Germany, and describes a search for her identity.

The book has won the Audre Lorde Literary award and has been read by Hügel-Marshall at public events across Germany, Austria and the US. It has been described as "an intensely moving journey in search of herself... a personal story, but also a microcosm of racism in contemporary Germany" and "in many ways, paradigmatic for the Black-German experience." In 2007 she gave a reading and seminar on the book among many places at the University of Rochester and in 2012, she gave a public reading at the Goethe Institute's annual Berlin & Beyond Film Festival.
