= Peggy Piesche =

German literary and cultural scientist

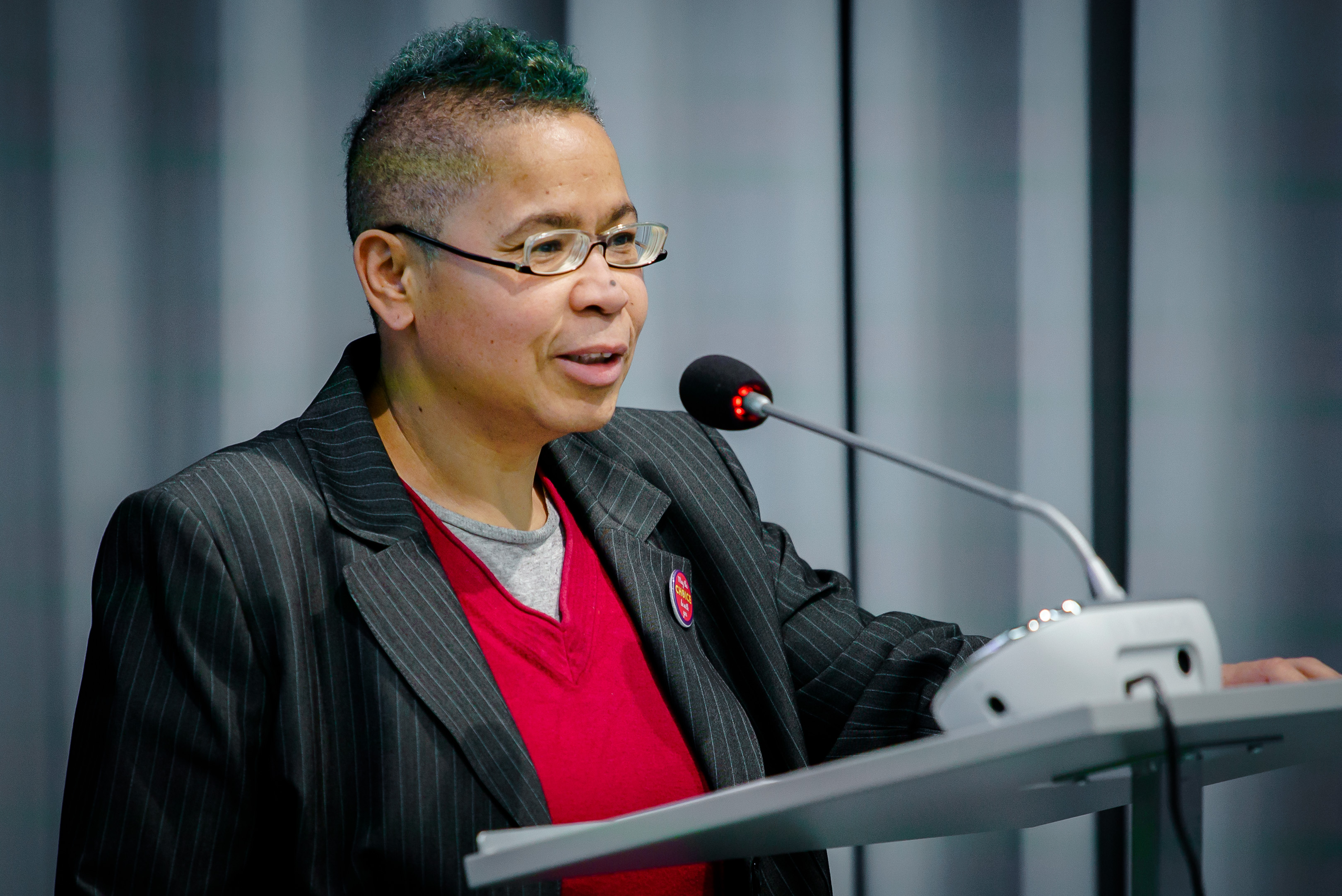
Peggy Piesche

Peggy Piesche (born 1968 in Arnstadt, Germany) is a German literary and cultural scientist, works in adult education and works as a consultant for diversity, intersectionality and decoloniality in the Bundeszentrale für politische Bildung (Federal Agency for Civic Education). Peggy Piesche is one of the most famous voices of Black women in Germany. Her identities also include lesbian.

== Life ==
=== Education ===
Peggy Piesche was born in Arnstadt (Thuringia) in what in 1968 was the German Democratic Republic. From 1974 to 1984 she attended a polytechnic high school in Arnstadt, then she graduated with Abitur (the high school diploma in Germany qualifying students for university) at the Gotha-Friedrichswerth vocational school. Starting in 1987, Piesche studied to become a teacher of German and Russian at the pedagogical high school in Erfurt/Mühlhausen. During that time, she did one semester abroad in Smolensk (USSR). Piesche moved to Tübingen after the fall of the Berlin wall. Once there, starting in 1990, she studied contemporary German literature, ancient history and philosophy. She graduated with a Master of Arts degree in 1995.

=== Academic career ===
After completing her studies, Piesche taught at the universities Bonn and Bochum from 1996 to 1999. Then she transferred to Utrecht Universität where she worked from 1996 to 2001 as a DAAD (German Academic Exchange Service) lecturer for the German department. In 2001 she became a member of the post-graduate program "Travel Literature and Cultural Anthropology" at the Universität Paderborn and had various teaching positions in Berlin at the Humboldt University and at the Freie Universität. Piesche was a research assistant at the Johannes Gutenberg Universität Mainz from 2004 to 2007, there she coordinated the funded project Black European Studies.

In 2007, Piesche moved to the United States and taught first at Vassar College in Poughkeepsie (NY), and from 2010 at Hamilton College in Clinton (NY). Then from 2013 to 2016 she did research for the Academy of Advanced African Studies at Universität Bayreuth with a focus on "Zukunftskonzeptionen in Afrika und der Diaspora" (concepts of the future in Africa and its diaspora). In Bayreuth she worked on the intersections of diaspora and trans locality, performativity of commemorative cultures as well as Black Feminist Future studies and Critical Race/whiteness Studies.

After her academic work Piesche transferred to Gunda Werner Institute for Feminism and Generational Democracy of the Heinrich Böll Foundation in 2017. There she worked as a speaker for reproductive justice and intersectional memory politics. Since November 2019 Piesche lease the area "Diversity, Intersectionality and Decolonization" of the Bundeszentrale für politische Bildung (Federal Agency for Civic Education.)

=== Political engagement ===
Piesche has been active in the Black feminist movement both in Germany and internationally since 1990. She has been a member of ADEFRA (Black Women in Germany) since 1990, she was also an honorary board member for a long time. She also served as a representative on an advisory board for ADEFRA for the drafting of the Equal Treatment Act, among other things.

While in the US Piesche was a member of the YWCA. Since 2016 she has been an Executive Board Member of ASWAD, the Association for the Study of the Worldwide African Diaspora.

Piesche served on ADEFRA's "Diversifying Matters" scholarly expert group for the Berlin Senate in 2018, which developed measures for the implementation of the UN Decade for People of African Descent 2015–2024. The consultation process is entitled "Making the Situation of Discrimination and Social Resilience of People of African Descent Visible."

=== Positions ===
Peggy Piesche is considered as one of the most well-known voices of Black women in Germany, she is recognized above all else for her experience as a Black woman in the context of the GDR. In doing so, she reflects on the lack of terms for being critical of racism for non-white people and groups in the GDR. She reflects also on the perception of reunification from a marginalized and migrant perspective, from which unification appeared primarily as the unification of "white East Germany" and "white West Germany." At the same time, she speaks to the space thus gained for better organization of Black people in both parts of the country.

In addition to her Black and East German perspectives, Piesche is recognized for her lesbianism. She criticizes players in the German gay and lesbian scene, calling Christopher Street Day a "depoliticized, conventionalized history" in which Black, queer and trans people are not represented. Likewise, she advocates for the decolonization of the commemoration of the 1968 movement, in which contribution of the Black and People of Color movement is not recognized enough.

=== Selected works ===
Peggy Piesche is the author and editor of several publications and articles:

- Befindlichkeit im Raum. (Sensitivity in Space) Poems, in: Olumide Popoola, Beldan Sezen (Hrsg.): Talking Home. Heimat aus unserer eigenen Feder (Homeland from our own pen). Frauen of Colour in Deutschland, Amsterdam, 1999.
- Tabu?!–Wovon man nicht spricht... Interkulturelle Kommunikation in deutsch-niederländischen Beziehungen (Taboo?! – What no one talks about... Intercultural communication in German-Dutch relations), Mitteilungschrift des DAB, Bd. 78, 1996–99, Heilbronn, 1999.
- Identität und Wahrnehmung in literarischen Texten Schwarzer deutscher Autorinnen der 90er Jahre (Identity and Perception in Literary Texts by Black German Women Authors of the 1990s), in: Gelbin, Konuk, Piesche, 1999.
- Together with Cathy S. Gelbin and Kader Konuk: Aufbrüche: Kulturelle Produktionen von Migrantinnen, Schwarzen und jüdischen Frauen in Deutschland (Awakenings: Cultural Productions of Migrant, Black and Jewish Women in Germany) Königsberg/Th.; 1999.
- Wasser aus der Wüste. Schwarze Autorinnen in Deutschland. Eine Anthologie (Water from the Desert: Black Women Writers in Germany: An Anthology), Berlin, Orlanda Frauenverlag; 2002.
- With Susan Arndt: Weißsein. Die Notwendigkeit Kritischer Weißseinsforschung (Whiteness: The Necessity of Critical Whiteness Studies), in: Susan Arndt und Nadja Ofuatey-Alazard: (K)Erben des Kolonialismus im Wissensarchiv deutsche Sprache. Ein kritisches Nachschlagewerk (Notches and Heirs of Colonialism in the Knowledge Archive of the German Language: A Critical Reference Work), Münster 2011, ISBN 978-3-89771-501-1
- Euer Schweigen schützt Euch nicht: Audre Lorde und die Schwarze Frauenbewegung in Deutschland (Your Silence Does Not Protect You: Audre Lorde and the Black Women's Movement in Germany), Berlin, Orlanda 2012, ISBN 978-3-936937-95-4
- Inscriptions into the Past, Anticipations of the Future: Audre Lorde and the Black Woman's Movement in Germany, in: S. Bolaki and S. Broeck (Hrsg.): Audre Lorde's "Transnational Legacies", University of Massachusetts Press, 2016.
- Exclusionary Acts: The Un-Making of Black German Agency in Transnational Black (German) Studies 2-3, A Conversation between Nicola Lauré al-Samarai and Peggy Piesche. With paintings by Thenjiwe Niki Nkosi, 2018
- Decolonize 68! Zur Methode einer intersektionalen Erinnerungsarbeit (Decolonize 68! On the Method of an Intersectional Memory Work), alpha nova, Berlin, 2019
- Politische Intersektionalität als Heilungsangebot, (Political Intersectionality as a Healing offer) in: Gunda-Werner-Insitut and Center for Intersectional Justice (Hrsg.): "Reach Everyone on the Planet..." Kimberlé Crenschaw und die Intersektionalität (Kimberlé Crenschaw and Intersectionality), April 2019, ISBN 978-3-86928-198-8
