= Bärbel Kampmann =

Afro-German psychologist, writer

- Born: March 26, 1946; Bielefeld, Germany
- Died: October 27, 1999 (aged 53); Gelsenkirchen, Germany
- Education: Ruhr University Bochum
- Occupation: Psychologist
- Known for: Anti-racism and integration efforts in Germany

Bärbel Kampmann (March 26, 1946 – October 27, 1999) was an Afro-German psychologist, writer, and civil servant. A well-known anti-racist activist in Germany, she led innovative integration programs in the German state of North Rhine-Westphalia that served as a model for the rest of the country.

== Early life ==
Bärbel Kampmann was born in Bielefeld, Germany, in 1946. Her father was an African American soldier, and her mother was a German woman from Bielefeld.

Her mother, Ilse Hilbert, had been a Nazi sympathizer, and her GI father left before Hilbert realized she was pregnant. As a child, she was forbidden to talk about her father. Her mother, along with her grandmother—who primarily raised her and often tried to protect her from racism—would try unsuccessfully to bleach her skin with Drula bleaching wax and hydrogen peroxide.

She was one of the first Afro-descendent children born in Germany after the end of Nazi rule, and she experienced a great deal of racism and isolation in her youth, including physical violence from other children.

== Career ==
After studying at a teachers' college in Cologne and working as a secondary school teacher, during which time she was an active trade unionist, Kampmann obtained a psychology degree from Ruhr University Bochum. She worked as a clinical therapist, primarily serving black Germans and migrants.

Kampmann settled in the German city of Gelsenkirchen, where beginning in 1986 she worked for the regional government to promote the welfare of migrant children and other young people. She was then promoted to the government in the regional capital of Düsseldorf, where she worked on issues of integration and discrimination in the Ministry of Labor and Social Affairs.

Her work in the North Rhine-Westphalia government on anti-discrimination projects was used as a model across Germany. These trend-setting efforts were noted for their then-novel emphasis on actually centering the perspectives of those facing discrimination.

She was a well-known anti-racist activist within the Afro-German community, considered a central champion of integration in this period. She was known for leading anti-racist workshops and founded the Gelsenkirchen Days Against Racism. She was also involved with ADEFRA, a black women's organization in Germany, and the Initiative of Black People in Germany. In addition to her anti-racist and pro-migrant activism, Kampmann was also markedly anti-imperialist and anti-capitalist.

Kampmann wrote a number of essays on the experiences of minorities in Germany, notably "Schwarze Deutsche. Lebensrealität und Probleme einer wenig beachteten Minderheit", in the 1994 book Andere Deutsche. Zur Lebenssituation von Menschen multiethnischer und multikultureller Herkunft.

== Personal life ==
Kampmann's first marriage ended in divorce, in part due to the stigma against interracial relationships at the time. She later remarried, wedding fellow psychologist Harald Gerunde.

In her late thirties, Kampmann traveled to the United States in search of her father, John T. Ballinger, whom she was eventually able to meet. However, she found herself disillusioned with the United States and began traveling instead to Guinea, where she came to feel particularly at home.

== Death and legacy ==
After falling ill, Kampmann died in 1999 in Gelsenkirchen, at age 53.

Her husband Harald Gerunde wrote a biography of her titled Eine von uns: Als Schwarze in Deutschland geboren (One of us: Born Black in Germany) in 2000.

In 2020, a street in Bremen was named in her honor.
