= Pierrette Herzberger-Fofana =

German-Malian politician (born 1949)

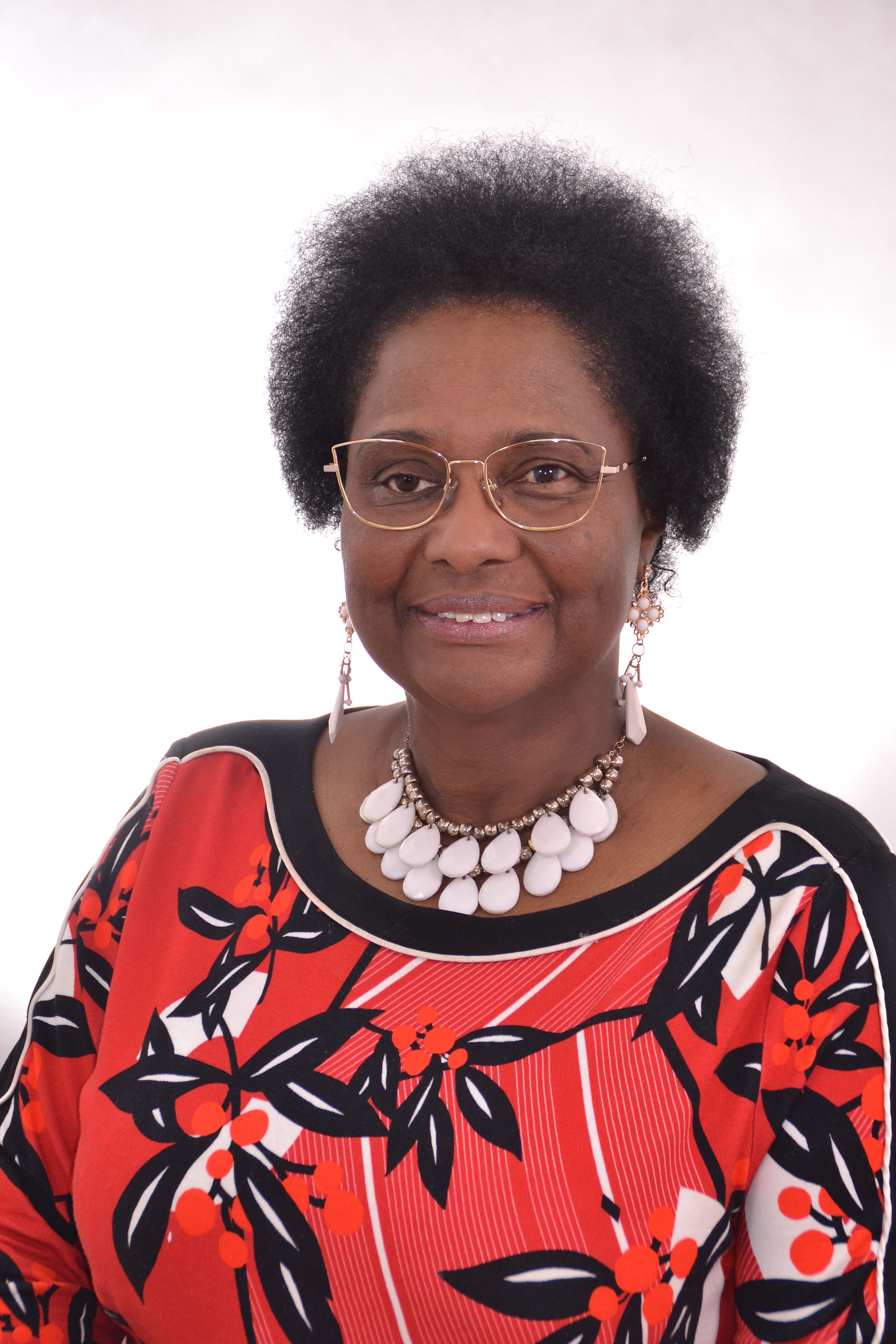

Member of the European Parliament
- In office 1 July 2019 – 15 July 2024
- Constituency: Germany

Personal details
- Born: Pierrette Gabrielle Fofana; March 20, 1949 (age 77) Bamako, French West Africa (now Mali)
- Citizenship: Germany
- Children: 3
- Occupation: Politician

Pierrette Gabrielle Herzberger-Fofana (born 20 March 1949) is a German-Malian politician of Alliance 90/The Greens and member of the European Parliament.

== Early life and education ==
Herzberger-Fofana grew up in Senegal. She graduated in Paris in German sociolinguistics and obtained a further degree from the University of Trier. She earned her doctorate at the University of Erlangen-Nuremberg with a dissertation that addressed women's literature in francophone sub-Saharan Africa.

== Political career ==
In 2005, Herzberger-Fofana was first elected to the city council of Erlangen. She was one of the fifteen recipients of the 2009 Helene-Weber-Preis, which is awarded to women engaged in municipal politics. She is a board member of DaMigra, the umbrella organization of immigrant organizations.

Herzberger-Fofana moved into the European Parliament on the 21st place in the European list of Alliance 90 / The Greens in the 2019 European elections in Germany 2019. She is currently Germany's only black MEP.

Herzberger-Fofana in the 2019-2024 legislature serves on the Committee on Development, holding one of four vice-chair positions. In addition to her committee assignments, Herzberger-Fofana is part of the Parliament's delegations for relations with the Pan-African Parliament and to the CARIFORUM-EU Parliamentary Committee. She also co-chairs the European Parliament Anti-Racism and Diversity Intergroup.

== Personal life ==
She has three children.

On 17 June 2020, Herzberger-Fofana claimed to have been harassed by two police officers in Brussels. The accusation was made in the chamber of the European parliament. Brussels prosecutors issued a criminal complaint against her for defamation as well as for “acting rebelliously and insulting police officers”.

== Works ==
- Écrivains africains et identités culturelles: entretiens, Stauffenburg, 1989, ISBN 3-923721-92-7
- Litterature feminine francophone d'Afrique noire, Editions L'Harmattan, 2001, ISBN 978-2738499059
- Die Nacht des Baobab. Zur Situation der ausländischen Frau am Beispiel von Afrikanerinnen in Deutschland In: Afro-Look: eine Zeitung von schwarzen Deutschen, Band 8, 1992/93, S. 14–15. (1992 Rede zur International Women's Day)
- Berlin 125 Jahre danach: Eine fast vergessene deutsch-afrikanische Geschichte, aa-infohaus, 2010, ISBN 978-3200020122.
