= Jean-Claude Mpassy =

Congolese footballer

Personal information
- Full name: Jean-Claude Mpassy-Nzoumba
- Date of birth: 27 May 1986 (age 40)
- Place of birth: Ilmenau, East Germany
- Height: 1.82 m (6 ft 0 in)
- Positions: Defender; defensive midfielder

Team information
- Current team: SC Columbia Floridsdorf

Youth career
- –2000: SV Germania Ilmenau
- 2000–2002: BFC Dynamo
- 2002–2004: FC Hansa Rostock

Senior career*
Years	Team	Apps	(Gls)
2004–2005	Hansa Rostock II	37	(0)
2005–2006	1. FC Kaiserslautern II	2	(0)
2006–2008	1. FC Saarbrücken	25	(0)
2008–2009	SV Elversberg	22	(1)
2009–2010	Wormatia Worms	0	(0)
2010–2011	FC Homburg	0	(0)
2011–	SC Columbia Floridsdorf		

International career^{‡}
2008	Congo	2	(0)
- * Club domestic league appearances and goals as of 6 January 2010 ‡ National team caps and goals as of 6 January 2010

Jean-Claude Mpassy-Nzoumba (born 27 May 1986 in Ilmenau) is a professional footballer who plays for SC Columbia Floridsdorf. Born in Germany, he has played for the Congo national team.

== International ==
His debut in the national team was on 8 June 2008 in Brazzaville vs. Sudan.
