= May Ayim =

German poet (1960–1996)

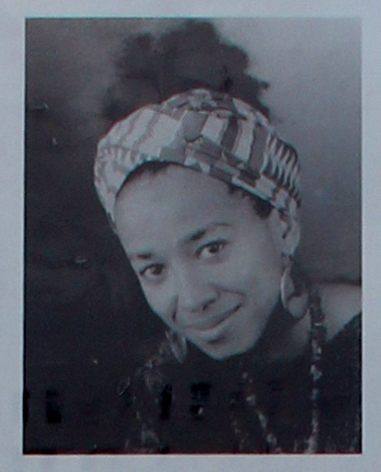
- Born: Brigitte Sylvia Andler; 3 May 1960; Hamburg, West Germany
- Died: 9 August 1996 (aged 36); Berlin, Germany
- Other name: May Opitz
- Education: University of Regensburg
- Occupations: Poet, writer, educator, activist

May Ayim (3 May 1960 – 9 August 1996) is the pen name of May Opitz (born Brigitte Sylvia Andler); she was an Afro-German poet, educator, and activist. The child of a German dancer and Ghanaian medical student, she lived with a white German foster family when young. After reconnecting with her father and his family in Ghana, in 1992 she took his surname for a pen name.

Opitz wrote a thesis at the University of Regensburg, "Afro-Deutsche: Ihre Kultur- und Sozialgeschichte auf dem Hintergrund gesellschaftlicher Veränderungen" (Afro-Germans: Their Cultural and Social History on the Background of Social Change), which was the first scholarly study of Afro-German history. Combined with contemporary materials, it was published as the book Farbe Bekennen: Afro-deutsche Frauen auf den Spuren ihrer Geschichte (1986). This was translated and published in English as Showing Our Colors: Afro-German Women Speak Out (1986). It included accounts by many women of Afro-German descent. Ayim worked as an activist to unite Afro-Germans and combat racism in German society. She co-founded Initiative Schwarze Menschen in Deutschland (Initiative of Black People in Germany) to that purpose in the late 1980s.

== Early life ==
Born Brigitte Sylvia Andler in 1960 in Hamburg-Altona, Germany, she was the daughter of unmarried parents Ursula Andler and Emmanuel Ayim. Her father, a Ghanaian medical student, wanted to have her raised by his childless sister, but German law made 'illegitimate' children a ward of the state and did not give rights to biological fathers.

After a brief time in a children's home, Andler lived in a foster family called Opitz, who raised her with their biological children. She grew up in Westphalia, where she later said that her childhood was unhappy. She considered her foster parents to be strict and spoke about how they used physical violence against her. This was one of the issues she explored in her later poetry. She later said that the family threw her out of the family home at the age of 19, which the Opitz family denied. She continued to keep in touch with them. That same year she graduated from Friedenschule, the Episcopal School in Münster, and passed her Abitur. She attended teacher training college in Münster, specialising in German language and Social Studies.

Opitz attended the University of Regensburg, majoring in Psychology and Education. During this period she travelled to Israel, Kenya and Ghana. She found her biological father, Emmanuel Ayim, then a professor of Medicine, and developed a relationship with him and his family. She used May Ayim as a pen name from 1992 to reflect this connection.

== Career ==
May Opitz's thesis at the University of Regensburg, Afro-Deutsche: Ihre Kultur- und Sozialgeschichte auf dem Hintergrund gesellschaftlicher Veränderungen (Afro-Germans: Their Cultural and Social History on the Background of Social Change). This was the first scholarly study of Afro-German history, ranging from the Middle Ages to the late 20th-century present. In 1986, it was the basis of the book, Farbe Bekennen: Afro-deutsche Frauen auf den Spuren ihrer Geschichte (published in English translation as Showing Our Colors: Afro-German Women Speak Out, 1986). Opitz edited this with Katharina Oguntoye and Dagmar Schultz, having added many accounts by contemporary Afro-German women. At this time she also co-founded the Initiative Schwarze Deutsche (Initiative of Black People in Germany).

Contemporary Afro-German women discussed their struggles growing up black in Germany, and how individuals explored their homeland and multi-ethnic identity. In some cases, it meant trying to find black fathers; in cases of adoption, they sometimes tried to find both parents.

Opitz, Oguntoye and Schultz decided to allow as many generations as possible to speak in this book. As the editors met with other Afro-German women and became involved with them, they connected with each other in a new way through this shared ancestry. The Afro-Germans began sharing their experiences with each other and contacting other Afro-Germans, as they searched for and discovered their history. The editors and writers said they did not want to have to explain their existence anymore. They wanted to be sure of their identity and able to assert it to others. The editors went public with their experiences in this book, discussing their histories and the prevalence of racism, while sharing their own personal experiences. Opitz, Oguntoye and Schultz felt that as they pushed for Afro-Germans to become more visible, future generations of Afro-Germans would feel less isolated and marginalized. This group identified as Afro-German, in part to prevent being defined by others.

Opitz helped found the Initiative Schwarze Deutsche und Schwarze in Deutschland (Initiative of Black Germans and Black People in Germany). It is known in short as Initiative Schwarze Deutsche (ISD), pushing for Afro-Germans to unite in mutual support. Audre Lorde was a chief leader in founding this group. A film documentary, Audre Lorde: The Berlin Years 1984 to 1992, covers her life and this period of growing Afro-German identity in the culture.

After a visit to Ghana, where she met her paternal family, she returned to Germany and trained as a speech therapist. She wrote a thesis on ethnocentrism in the discipline. After more travels, she settled in Berlin in 1984, lecturing at the Free University of Berlin. She continued to write articles and poetry exploring the issues of multi-ethnic peoples in Germany and personal identity.

Ayim was active in the movement against South African apartheid in Berlin.

In 1992 she took her father's name Ayim, and used May Ayim as her pen name. She was active as an educator and writer, taking part in many conferences and publishing a poetry collection, Blues in schwarz-weiss (Blues in Black and White, 2003 in the US).

== Death ==
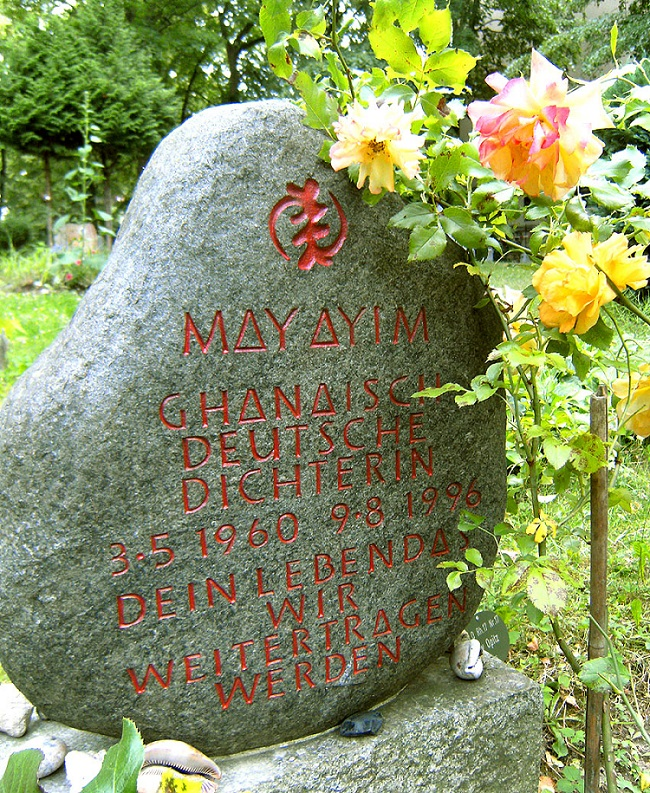
Ayim's grave at the Alter St.-Matthäus-Kirchhof in Berlin-Schöneberg.

After working strenuously to prepare for Black History Month in 1996, Ayim suffered a mental and physical collapse. She was admitted to the psychiatric ward of the Auguste Viktoria Hospital in Berlin in January 1996. The doctors eventually diagnosed her as having multiple sclerosis. They stopped her medication, which had been based on believing she had severe depression, and discharged her in April 1996. Continuing to struggle with depression, Ayim was readmitted in June following a suicide attempt. Discharged again in July, she died by suicide on 9 August by jumping from the 13th floor of a Berlin building.

== Books ==
- Oguntoye, Katharina; Opitz, May; Schultz, Dagmar, eds. (1986). Farbe bekennen: afro-deutsche Frauen auf den Spuren ihrer Geschichte (in German) (1 ed.). Berlin: Orlanda Frauenverlag. ISBN 9783922166214. English translation: Optiz, May; Oguntoye, Katharina; Schultz, Dagmar, eds. (1992). Showing our colors: Afro-German women speak out. Amherst: University of Massachusetts Press. ISBN 9780870237591.
- Ayim, May; Mertins, Silke (1997). Grenzenlos und unverschämt (in German) (1 ed.). Berlin: Orlanda-Frauenverlag. ISBN 9783929823455.
- Ayim, May; Adams, Anne V. (2003). Blues in black and white: a collection of essays, poetry and conversations. Trenton, N.J: Africa World Press. ISBN 9780865438903.

== Legacy and honours ==
- The 1997 film documentary Hoffnung im Herz ("Hope in My Heart: The May Ayim Story"), directed by Maria Binder, was made about her.
- 2004: the May Ayim Award was founded to honour her. Presented annually, it is the first Black German international literature award.
- 2011: A street in Berlin Kreuzberg, formerly named after a German colonialist, was renamed in her honour as May-Ayim-Ufer.

== In popular culture ==
- May Ayim's poem "They're People Like Us" is cited in Paul Beatty's 2008 novel Slumberland. Her writing (as May Opitz) is included in the 1992 anthology Daughters of Africa.
- She is the subject of Linton Kwesi Johnson's elegiac poem "Reggae Fi May Ayim" on his 1999 album More Time.
- The opening track on The Other Others eponymous 2023 album is called "The Birth of May Ayim".

== See also ==
- Afro-Germans
- Jennifer Teege
