= Akwasi Oduro =

Belgian footballer (born 1987)

Personal information
- Full name: Akwasi Qwakeye Oduro
- Date of birth: 8 February 1988 (age 38)
- Place of birth: Cologne, Germany
- Height: 1.80 m (5 ft 11 in)
- Position: Left back

Youth career
- 1997–1999: Gierle
- 1999–2001: Turnhout
- 2001–2006: Standard Liège

Senior career*
Years	Team	Apps	(Gls)
2006–2008	Beveren	26	(1)
2008–2009	Radnički Kragujevac	18	(1)
2009–2010	Bodø/Glimt	14	(0)
2010–2011	Capellen	20	(2)
2011–2012	Turnhout		
2013–2014	KFC Katelijne-Waver		
2014–2015	Turnhout	14	(0)
2015–?	KVK Beringen		
- * Club domestic league appearances and goals as of 3 January 2016

Akwasi Qwakeye Oduro (born 8 February 1987) is a Belgian former professional footballer who played as a left-back.

== Career ==
Born in Cologne, Oduro emigrated to Belgium when he was ten and started playing for Gierle and K.V. Turnhout. At the age of 14 he moved to Standard de Liège where stayed until 2006 when he moved to the first team of KSK Beveren, playing four matches in his first season. In August 2008 he went for a trial at English League Two club Swindon Town and later at Chesterfield. Oduro left than in September 2008 his club K.S.K. Beveren and signed with Radnički Kragujevac of the Srpska Liga. In February 2009, after trialling at Norwegian club Bodø/Glimt, he was to sign a contract with the club.

He then returned to Belgium and played with Capellen and Turnhout in the Belgian Second Amateur Division.

== Personal life ==
Oduro who was born in Cologne, Germany and is of Ghanaian descent, but he holds a Belgian passport.
