= Serious Klein =

German rapper

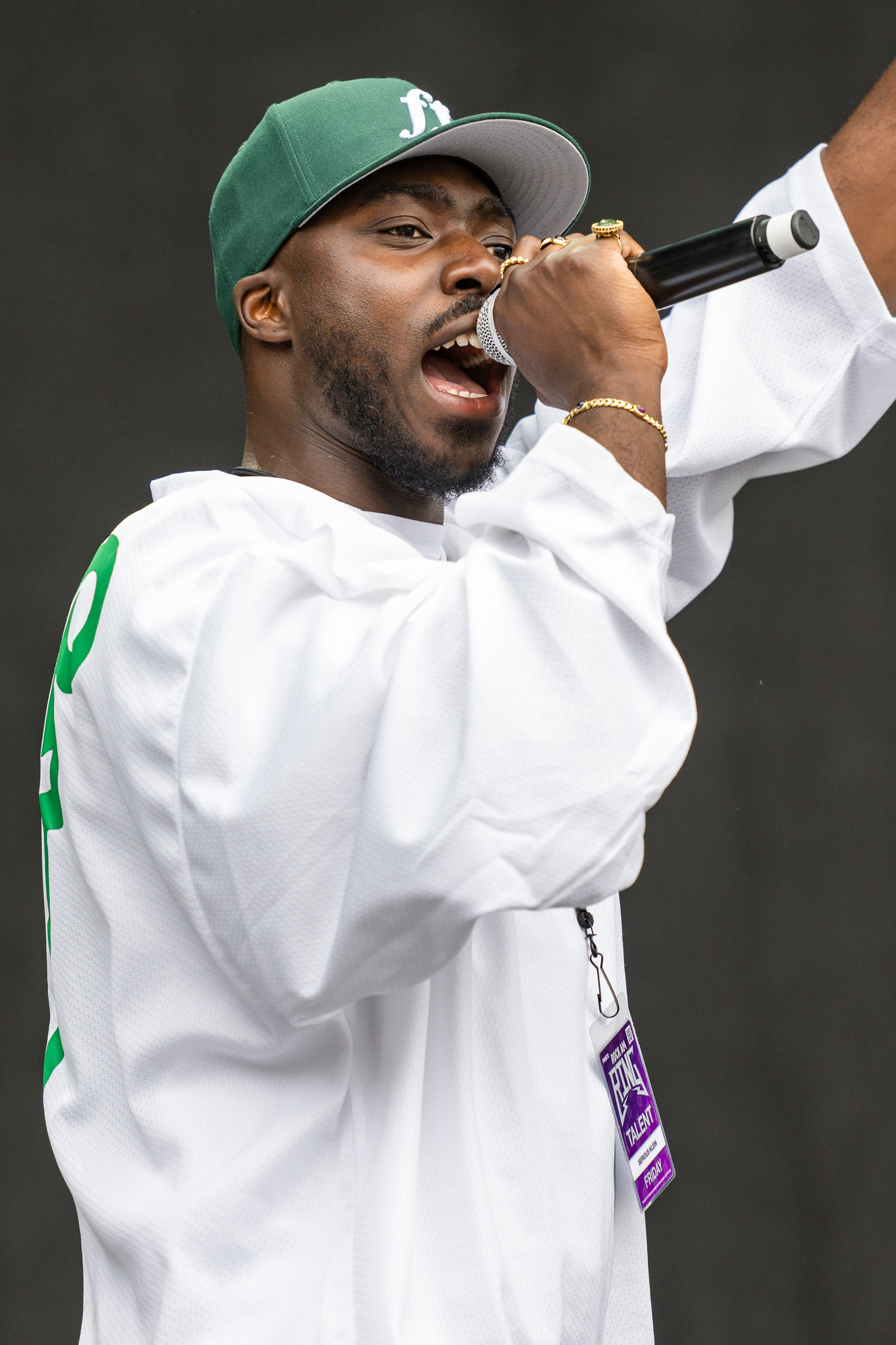
- Klein in 2022

Background information
- Also known as: Seri The King
- Born: Kelvin Boakye; June 6, 1991 (age 34); Hannover, Germany
- Genres: Hip hop; trap
- Occupations: Rapper; singer; songwriter
- Years active: 2009–present
- Labels: Majestic Casual Records; Mass Appeal

Kelvin Boakye (born 6 June 1991), known by the stage name Serious Klein, is a German rapper who has emerged from the underground hip-hop scene in Germany.

== Early life ==
Serious Klein was born in Hannover, Germany to Ghanaian parents. His mother (a single mother) works in kindergarten and his father is a businessman. His parents separated when he was two years old and they moved to Duisburg, Germany at the age of four. He later moved to Oer-Erkenschwick. Serious started writing music at the early age of 12. He recorded his first song when he was 14 years old through a school project with the former music label VJ-Style.

== Career ==
Serious Klein began performing under the name "key bee" which is short for his birth name Kelvin Boakye and changed his name to the present one in 2012. His mentor Ross Osei and his former in house producer Johannes "Shove Island" Altendorf took him under their wings and made him part of their own label DSTY records in 2009. He later formed the collective and label, the family tree / 555, together with his manager Teddy Sarpong, his tour DJ Dominik "Dayson" Antwi (in 2015), and his producer and long time collaborator Tobias "Rascal" Breuer.

Serious recorded his first EP The Serious Outlook in 2012 which helped him get recognized locally in Germany. After his first EP, he did the following EPs The Introduction in 2015, and Summer 03's Problem in 2016.

Serious released his debut album You Should've Known in 2018, out via Majestic Casual. He performed at the Esquire Awards in Dubai 2017, held in celebration of achievements by men and women in the middle east.

In November 2024, it was announced that Serious had signed to Nas' record label Mass Appeal Records.

== Discography ==
=== Studio albums ===
- You Should've Known (August 2018)

=== EPs ===
- The Introduction (June 17, 2015)
- Summer 03’s Problem (August 2, 2016)
- Ludus (2021)

=== Singles ===
Year	Title	Ref
2017	"Try Me"	
2018	"Boy Boy"	
2018	"91 Flex"	
2018	"Coochie Money"	
2018	"Should've Known"	
2018	"Voodoo Money"	
2018	"Junior" (featuring Ahmaad Mateen)	
2018	"These Days"	
2019	"On a Goat"	
2019	"No Drill" (Frizzo featuring Serious Klein)	
2019	"Lil Capo"	
2019	"Die For You" (Amilli featuring Serious Klein)	
2020	"Everyday Thursday" (Drunken Masters with Serious Klein)	
2021	"Straight Outta Pandemic" (featuring Anaiis)	
2021	"The Shaw"	
2023	"White Knight" (featuring Josh Kye)	
2023	"Up"	
2023	"Peek a Boo - A Colors Show"	
2024	"Stronger"	
2024	"Pencils"	
2024	"Ohene"	
