= Dagmar Schultz =

German sociologist, film producer, publisher and lecturer

Dagmar Schultz (born 1941 in Berlin) is a German sociologist, filmmaker, publisher and professor.

== Biography ==
Schultz grew up in a female household; her father committed suicide in World War II. After a few semesters studying journalism, North American studies and Romance studies at the Free University of Berlin. In 1965, she graduated from the University of Michigan in broadcasting, television and film, with a master's thesis on "The Role of Broadcasting in Africa with Special Emphasis on West Africa". However, her dream of working as a documentary filmmaker on television proved to be unrealizable: "My job interview at CBS or NBC was such that the gentlemen asked me, 'What do you mean, why we hire women here?' That was a rhetorical question - and the answer: 'Yes, as a cleaning woman and as secretaries.' " In 1965 Schultz taught at Rust College in Holly Springs, Mississippi.

In 1966/67 she went to Puerto Rico, where she worked in the Anti-Poverty Programs of the Office of Economic Opportunity. From 1969 to 1970, she taught seminars on women's studies and on race and class at Columbia College Chicago and was active in the women’s movement. In 1972, Schultz was awarded a Ph.D. at University of Wisconsin–Madison, with a dissertation on workers' education and her Habilitation from the Free University of Berlin with a study on the life and work of female and male professors. In 1973, she returned to Germany and taught women's studies and cultural and immigration issues at the John F. Kennedy Institute for North American Studies at the Free University of Berlin. Dagmar Schultz brought the book Our Bodies - Ourselves to the Women's Center in West Berlin, where it was immediately translated and applied, and in 1974 she founded the first Feminist Health Center in Germany, which still exists today. She worked with the center until 1981.

She established, with a few fellow campaigners, a book publishing house specialized on feminist literature. She also co-founded Orlanda Women's Press (Orlanda Frauenverlag) in 1974, and was (co-)editor until 2001. As a visiting professor, she taught sociology of education at State University of New York in 1981. In 1984, she helped civil rights activist and poet Audre Lorde, whom she got to know at the 1980 UN World Conference on Women in Copenhagen, to become a visiting professor at FU Berlin. Lorde would go on to influence the politics of the Black German women's movement of the 1980s and 1990s.

In 1989, she habilitated at the Institute of Sociology of the Free University of Berlin. In 1991, Schultz followed the call for a professorship for "Social and Educational Work with Women" at the Department of Social Work and Social Education of Alice Salomon University of Applied Sciences Berlin, where she remained until her retirement in 2004. Her work focused on women in social work, intercultural social work, medical sociology and social education, socialization and cultural competence in psychosocial care.

Since 2004, Dagmar Schultz has been involved in writing and organising reading tours in the United States for her partner Ika Hügel-Marshall (author of Invisible Woman. Growing up Black in Germany) and other events. In 2007 she was co-producer of the film "Hope in My Heart - The May Ayim Story".

In 2011 Schultz was honored by Peter-André Alt with the "Margherita von Brentano Award", the highest endowed award for gender studies and women's projects in Germany. In 2012, Schultz invested her prize money on the one hand in the structure of an Audre Lorde archive at the FU Berlin, on the other she produced and directed a documentary about the time in Germany by the author Audre Lorde ("Audre Lorde - The Berlin years from 1984 to 1992"). She wrote the screenplay together with her partner Ika Hügel-Marshall. The film had its premiere at the 2012 Berlin International Film Festival and was shown at numerous other international festivals. The same year, Schultz became dignified the "Magnus-Hirschfeld-Award" for her life's work as one of the first activists of the lesbian and women's movement since the 1970s, an award donated by the gay section of SPD to honor outstanding achievements for the emancipation of lesbians, gays and transgender people.

Dagmar Schultz is passionate about photography, and among others her photos of plants and flowers have appeared on book covers at Orlanda Verlag and Fischer Verlag.

== Books ==
- Dagmar Schultz, Simone Langenheder: Die Entwicklung der Frauengesundheitszentren in der Bundesrepublik Deutschland und ihre Bedeutung für die Gesundheitsversorgung von Frauen BMFSFJ 1996
- Dagmar Schultz: Ein Mädchen ist fast so gut wie ein Junge: Sexismus in der Erziehung. Band 1: Interviews, Berichte, Analysen. 2. Auflage 1980 ISBN 978-3-922-16600-9
- Dagmar Schultz: Ein Mädchen ist fast so gut wie ein Junge: Sexismus in der Erziehung. Band 2: Schülerinnen und Pädagogen berichten. 1979 ISBN 978-3-922-16609-2
- Dagmar Schultz, Carol Hagemann-White: Das Geschlecht läuft immer mit: die Arbeitswelt von Professorinnen und Professoren. Centaurus 1991 ISBN 978-3-890-85435-9
- Audre Lorde, Adrienne Rich, Dagmar Schultz (Hrsg.): Macht und Sinnlichkeit: ausgewählte Texte 3., erw. Aufl. 1991 ISBN 978-3-922166-13-9
- May Opitz, Katharina Oguntoye, Dagmar Schultz: Showing Our Colors: Afro-German Women Speak Out. 1992 ISBN 978-0-870-23759-1
- Ika Hügel-Marshall, Chris Lange, May Ayim, Ilona Bubeck, Gülşen Aktaş, Dagmar Schultz: Entfernte Verbindungen. Rassismus, Antisemitismus, Klassenunterdrückung. 1993 ISBN 978-3-922-16691-7
- Edith Hoshino Altbach, Jeanette Clausen, Dagmar Schultz, Naomi Stephan: German Feminism: Readings in Politic and Literature. SUNY Press Albany 1984 ISBN 978-0-873-95841-7
- Dagmar Schultz: Changing political nature of workers’ education: a case study of the Wisconsin School for Workers. Dissertation 1972

== Filmographie ==
- 2007, Hope in my heart : A profile of the life and work of May Ayim as co-producer alongside Maria Binder OCLC 39657930
- 2012, Audre Lorde : the Berlin Years, 1984 to 1992 as a producer and director as well as alongside Ika Hügel-Marshall as co-screenwriter OCLC 972326509
