= Showing Our Colors: Afro-German Women Speak Out =

English translation of the German book Farbe bekennen

- Editors: May Ayim, Katharina Oguntoye, and Dagmar Schultz
- Language: German; English
- Genre: Non-fiction
- Published: 1986
- Publication place: Germany

Showing Our Colors: Afro-German Women Speak Out is an English translation of the German book Farbe bekennen: Afro-deutsche Frauen auf den Spuren ihrer Geschichte edited by author May Ayim, Katharina Oguntoye, and Dagmar Schultz. It is the first published book by Afro-Germans. It is the first written use of the term Afro-German. A compilation of texts, testimonials and other secondary sources, the collection brings to life the stories of black German women living amid racism, sexism and other institutional constraints in Germany. The book draws on themes and motifs prevalent in Germany from the earliest colonial interactions between Germany and black "otherness," up through the lived experiences of black German women in the 1980s. It was groundbreaking not only for the degree to which it examined the Afro-German experience, which had been generally ignored in the larger popular discourse, but also as a forum for women to have a voice in constructing this narrative. The book also acted as a source for these Afro-German women to have a platform where their stories can be heard. The stories that were told helped the development of an Afro-German community as a common theme throughout Showing Our Colors was the idea of feeling alone and as though there was no one to relate to. The discussion of this loss of connection to others helped Afro-Germans come together and unite.

The book is subdivided into three chronologically organized subsections, which navigate the historical origins of German perceptions of Africa and blackness, the Brown Babies and accompanying social problems immediately following World War II in Germany, and finally anecdotes and narratives contextualized in lingering modern racism in Germany. Contributors, alongside the three editors, include Doris Reiprich, Erika Ngambi Ul Kuo, Helge Emde, Astrid Berger, Miriam Goldschmidt, Laura Baum, Ellen Wiedenroth, Julia Berger, Corinna N., Angelika Eisenbrandt, Abena Adomako, and Raya Lubinetzki.

== Connection to Gilroy's Black Atlantic ==
In order to engage the ways in which Showing Our Colors nuances our understanding of black diasporic relationships, it is worthwhile to establish how the Black Atlantic serves as a space of transnational diasporic exchange. In his 1993 book The Black Atlantic: Modernity and Double Consciousness, Paul Gilroy analyzed the way that narratives of continental and diasporic African peoples and their descendants occur in spaces surrounding the Atlantic Ocean. Highlighting ships as the vessels of trans-Atlantic Black movement and interaction, he conceptualized the Black Atlantic as the location and unit of analysis in interpreting diasporic conversation outside of the structures of geopolitical nationhood. This de-emphasis of national borders as authorial entities that legitimize peoplehood provides space for analyses like the present one in that it recognizes the inherent transnational and intercultural nature of diasporic populations. Gilroy stated: "The history of the Black Atlantic since then, continually crisscrossed by the movements of black people—not only as commodities but engaged in various struggles towards emancipation, autonomy, and citizenship—provides a means to reexamine the problems of nationality, location, identity, and historical memory." Showing Our Colors directly participates in this theoretical framework as a preeminent text exploring the black German struggle to find physical and metaphysical place of belonging in all four of the domains Gilroy listed. The women continually recounted the ways that they are barred access to participation in German national identity on the basis of blackness. The thematic search for affirmation of belonging throughout the Black Atlantic makes Showing Our Colors a significant example of the way Black diasporic populations make transnational connections as they formulate their conceptions of self that entail much more than a singular national identity.

Showing Our Colors is one of the first iterations of the Black German experience, and its construction through transnational dialogue and inquiry marks a significant moment in studies of the African diaspora. By virtue of expressing their frustration with their marginalization in German society and by elucidating the uncertain position of diasporic peoples within the global context of nationalist identification, these women affirm their identities as transnational and intercultural beings. Perhaps best expressed in the following lines from Katharina Oguntoye's poem entitled "Reflection," Showing Our Colors is a testament to Black German women's struggle for recognition of personhood: "now i'm telling you as your afro-german sister, that by choosing to see me as a woman without color and without her own heritage, or as a puzzling being, somehow exotic, somehow an object you are ready to leave me hanging in a similar desperation." While the text delineates a shared diasporic struggle to find validation of belonging around the Black Atlantic, it is potentially in the building of the transnational diasporic community that sense of belonging can begin to be established.

== Influence of Audre Lorde ==
The most noteworthy trans-Atlantic diasporic connection to which Showing Our Colors speaks is that between black German women and black American women through the German women's contact with black, lesbian, womanist writer and activist Audre Lorde. Lorde's studies led her to engage with the black German experience as she furthered her ideology of intersectional resistance to oppression to include differences in nationality in the context of the diasporic community. The following statement from her 1979 speech entitled "The Master's Tools Will Never Dismantle the Master's House" is indicative of her conception of community as the requisite site of resistance to oppression that Showing Our Colors employs: "Without community there is no liberation, only the most vulnerable and temporary armistice between an individual and her oppression. But community must not mean a shedding of our differences, nor the pathetic pretense that these differences do not exist." Throughout the book it is evident the way that Lorde helped the black German women access this type of community to formulate a consciousness surrounding their own oppression in Germany and their role in the transnational diasporic network. Lorde's presence was integral to stimulating a sense of self-exploration and self-expression in these women who had previously grown up in the absence of a black community, and as a collective they created this important documentation of their previously heard narratives as African diasporic individuals in Germany. This moment is a significant piece of diasporic history, as it marks an interaction between two points of Gilroy's Black Atlantic working in concert to write their lived experiences into the larger diasporic narrative. Lorde is even credited with coining the term "Afro-German".

== Chapter and interviews ==
=== Precolonial Images of Africa, Colonialism, Fascism ===
The first chapter of the novel describes pre-existing opinions and ideas of Africans in pre-colonial Germany. May Ayim focuses mostly on religious ideas, particularly the idea that anything black is a mark of evil in the Christian faith. In addition, she talks of sexism within the religious and societal bonds of the time in that woman where expected to be dutiful and weak, but equally to be made desirable to her husband while not attracting other men. Ayim contrasts this idea with the one that negativite femininity was portrayed as a "blackened" woman or black ugly female beast such as in the anonymous poem "Wolfdietrich's Saga" from the mid-13th century. In this chapter Ayim also discuss the root of the word Moor and its subsequent switch to the word Negro. Moor served in the Middle Ages to "differentiate between black and white heathens". The word was not necessary tied to a negative idea of skin color. However, in the 18th century Negroes became the more come term that was especially negative with the expansion of colonialism and slavery.

=== Father was Cameroonian, Our Mother, East Prussian, We are Mulattos ===
This interview is with sisters Doris Reiprich (67) and Erika Ngambi ul Kio (70), the daughters of Mandenga Diek, as they talk about their experience being Afro-German in Germany both before and after World War II. Their parents were married in 1914 and even though the other children would sometimes call them "Negroes" it was not in a way that bothered them and they felt fairly happy in childhood. However, the girls were excluded from certain activities such as the Gymnastic League, and later struggled to find jobs, since employers only hired whites.

During the war the women faced mounting discrimination. Erika survived with her husband, who was able to find roles as an actor in colonial films about Germany. Doris, however, stayed at home in Danzig. In one incident she talks about nearly being sterilized, because of a Nazi forced sterilization program of all colored people in that area; however, she is let go by a sympathetic clinic worker. Later Doris watched as other colored people are taken to concentration camps, and she is even picked up by "watchdogs", soldier who picked up anyone suspicious-looking, and made to do forced labor for several days before escaping home during a bomb scare.

After the war, Doris and her mother are in Poland and struggle to leave. In one section Doris states: "After the war we wanted to get out of Poland and go back to Germany. The Russians offered us free passage to Africa." Now both sisters still live in Germany and feel happy. Doris states, "After the Nazi period the hostilities toward us quickly tapered off. I can't forget everything from that time, but I'm no longer miserable either."

The interesting theme of this interview is that even after all that both sisters had faced while in wartime Germany, they both identified as German. It can be said this was the reason that the German government tried to suppress, kill, and sterilize those of color. In Germany to be German was to be of the Aryan race, to be a hundred percent white German blood. It was assumed anyone of color was immediately of somewhere else. However, neither Doris nor Erika had another home or felt relation to Africa, so always have felt completely German.

=== Afro-Germans after 1945: the "occupation babies" ===
After the interview with Doris and Erika, the book resumes Ayim's history of racism in Germany, picking up in the days after World War II. Ayim quotes newspaper articles and government reports to show how the German public conceived of the so-called "occupation babies," children born of German mothers and African-American soldiers stationed in Germany after the war. Ayim uses the prejudice against both the babies and their mothers to show how racism and sexism are often intertwined. "Since loose morals were always ascribed to the mothers, Afro-German girls were not only subjected to racist preconceptions, they were also accused of being inclined toward the mother's 'aberrant behavior,'" she writes. This is further illustrated by the next few chapters, which include interviews with Afro-German women such as Helga Emde, who grew up facing that double prejudice in the aftermath of World War II.

== Publication details and translation ==
The book was originally published in its German iteration by Orlanda Frauenverlag in 1986. Orlanda is a feminist publishing company based in Berlin. The book was edited by May Ayim (the pen name of May Opitz), Dagmar Schultz, and Katharina Oguntoye, each of whom interacted with Germany in a unique way and contributed their perspectives to the story. The book was translated to English in 1992 by the University of Massachusetts Press.

A foreword to the English translation was written by Audre Lorde. While teaching at the Free University in Berlin, Lorde ultimately collaborated on the book initially came together and began sharing their stories. In the foreword, Lorde, explaining the purpose and goal of the work, writes: "In the interest of all our survivals and the survival of our children, these black German women claim their color and their voices."

Women's Review of Books credits the book with constructing "a theoretical framework that is filled out by the voices of women ranging in age from 22 to 70. Beside being a sharp indictment of German racism, the book also gives moving personal accounts of changes in Afro-German daily life. The women who speak here clearly understand the ways German racism and sexism are intertwined."

== Hypersexuality and demonization ==
Nation and race both converge upon the black male body such that his presence in Germany as both a soldier and a Frenchman is embarrassing to the national German image. Both the image of "Jumbo" and the one on the Bavarian mint highlight the ways in which black men are being hypersexualized, and hypermasculinized. In the Jumbo image, the black French soldier is abnormally large and towering over what looks like a German colony. His wide open mouth and bared teeth, coupled with the array of seemingly dead naked white women, come together to show the black man as freakishly inhuman. He seeks to devour the sexuality of white women because he simply cannot "control himself." Then the white woman tied to the head of what is supposed to be a black man's helmeted penis showcases the black soldier's sexuality as enslavement. The fact that there is just a penis detached from the body once again propagates the image of not a man but an object. These same tactics were used to position black men in the U.S. as hypersexual hypermasculine creatures who endanger white female sexuality and purity and thus "endanger whites all around.

== Exoticism ==
Showing Our Colors explores the way by which Afro-Germans were historically attributed shameful, negative or patronizing characteristics with regard to their "non-white" skin color. Because so many negative connotations were associated with "blackness" at the time, many Afro-Germans identified that what was found to be more threatening to Germans at the time than the idea of deviation from the norm or "whiteness" was the idea of "intrusion" or destroying this white norm. Showing Our Colors notes that, apart from their appearance, many Afro-Germans labeled as "exotic" had nothing "foreign" to offer in that they spoke German perfectly, had German names and had no direct connection with Africa/US. They had a very normal German existence and this reality threatened the backwards understanding of what it meant to be German – which at its core was white. Therefore, the use of "exotic" as a compliment served as a tactful way to make it indirectly understood that such a woman cannot be simply a "beauty", but is only capable of being an "exotic beauty". In that sense, the term "exotic" masks and reaffirms the idea that any deviation from white, regardless of shade, should be understood as "other" or "unnatural".

== Importance of the anthology ==
Showing Our Colors, as an anthology translated from German including a collection of poetry, essays, and biographical profiles, functions to document and share the history and experience of Africans in Germany and Afro Germans. Despite being in the form of first-hand of accounts and expression it provides an accurate lens to look into the evolution of the construct of race and race relations in Germany, as well as the intersection of blackness with sexuality and feminism. With the contributors' identity at the intersection of two oppressed target or minority groups, the work highlights some of the worst treatment of Afro Germans. Black women in general have a heavy burden placed upon them and withstand a lot of internal and external pressures. Yet, at the same time, they must remain whole and grounded despite the countless instances of sexualization, attacks, racism, etc. The work provides a history lesson through memory, emotion, and experience that otherwise would not have been visible in a simple receipt of history.

In many of their accounts the women express the sentiment of being an otherness despite not knowing anything else. In their minds, they were German: they spoke German, read German and even were habituated to believe the conditioned racism that was asserted in children's books. They knew nothing else but the German lifestyle and culture, but for some reason unknown to them, they were outcast and ostracized. This may be partly attributed to the fact that Germany's racism was internalized and ingrained in society despite their band aid of an effort to function as a post-racial society. A refutation of its past was futile if there was no proactive change made. Race is seen as a shadow from a dark past that should never be spoken about, and is therefore ignored by society. As the girls got older, they were plagued with the discomfort of knowing that they would never quite fit into the standard of the ideal German woman. They exist in the in-betweeness of the symbolic Black Atlantic in not being accepted as German, despite being able to speak perfect colloquial German, but also not belonging to a definitive black group either.

The creation of this anthology served a revolutionary purpose in the lives of the afro German women involved. These women were desperately looking for a community, or space that would ground and affirm their identity that was seen as so tainted. The space that the collection of information offered was comforting and allowed the women involved to feel validated. Audre Lorde says that she is "excited by these women, by their blossoming sense of identity, as they say, "Let us be ourselves now as we define us. We are not a figment of your imagination or an exotic answer to you desires. I see these women as a growing force for international change, in contact with other Afro Europeans, Afro Asians, Afro Americans." For most, this is the first time in their lives were they are feeling validated, affirmed, and seen. This underlying support gave many the strength to continue to live out their daily, oppressed lives. Lorde and the others essentially use memory as a tool to liberate themselves and their community.

The collection of narratives also serves to show a lived history. Many of these women experienced proactive changes in the German construct of race both before and after the war. For example, the evolution from the use of the word "Moors" to the use of "Negroes" shows the accent or highlight of differences from physical characteristics to cultural and more subtle ones. This again goes to reinforce Gilroy's idea from the Black Atlantic showing that blackness exceeds the nation state and cannot be confined, which is why the standards that the nation state lays out must always change to confine their new knowledge about blackness. Race is a social construct that must always change and be modified to conform to the agenda and goals of the agent group. In sum, this collaboration resonance allowed these women to even form a concept of their identity because "how does one come to define a cultural identity when you have seen no other black person throughout your childhood?" Although this composition of the work was meant to be an empowering space, it would be a failure to not acknowledge that the entire process was mitigated and assembled by white Germans; therein lies an inherent power dynamic.
