= Senegalese hip-hop =

Music genre or scene

Flag of Senegal.

Senegalese hip hop is a form of hip hop that originated in Senegal in the early 1980s. When hip hop first hit the scene in Africa, it went from merely being a fad, to a more social and political movement. Amongst the most influential leaders of this movement were artists from the country of Senegal. With the modernization of the country, and the rise in media, the youth of Senegal were able to embrace a new form of expression.

One of the main reasons why hip hop has become preeminent in Senegal is due to its mixture of sound and culture. "Senegal's hip hop scene is distinctive and its artist extremely talented. The country has a history of strong musical traditions..." Moreover, hip hop has not only become an aspect of life for the Senegalese people, but more importantly has translated to a way of life, gathering influence from the musical expression prior to its rise in Senegal, and understanding their past as it pertains heavily to its socially present state within music.

== Colonization of Senegal ==
To understand Senegal's popularity as a mixture of different sounds is understanding Senegal's history of colonization. Modern Senegal is made up of an ethnically diverse group of people. "The largest of the city include the Wolof (44% of the population), Fulani and Tukulor (24%), Serer (15%), Diola (5%) and, Mandinka (4%)." During the 9th century the Tukulor settled in the Senegal River Valley and resided there until the 14th century. Within their rein, into the mid 11th century they converted to Islam. The Mali Empire expanded during the 14th century, and in the 15th century, the Wolf established the Jolof Empire in Senegal. The Portuguese settlers set up trading spaces for access to resources, but by the 17th century, the city was rid of the Portuguese by the Dutch and the French. The French resided there until 1895 when Senegal was established as a French colony.

In the early 1960s Senegal became an autonomous republic within the French community. Hence forward, the estate went through several forms of political oppression and reconstruction until finally Abdoulaye Wade was elected president in March 2000 and the Senegalese Democratic Party had finally won, bringing peace and improvement to the land. "The development of modern music dates back to the musical traditions established by 'griots' in the days of the Mali-Songhay empires." It can be noted that the first form of musical expression made in Senegal date back to the 14th century in the forms of griots.

== History of griots ==
Prior to the wide spread of hip hop in Senegal, traditional music was transcended through pre-ordained griots. The term griot, also known as gewel, can be defined as, "... traditional praise-singer, musician, social go-between, counselors, or dancer and acrobat," These individuals were born into, "endogamous, professionally specialized group often referred to as a 'caste'." Their position in Senegal society was that of much importance for griots were also known for their abilities as oral specialist who, "...had to guarantee not only the survival of their people as a culturally and historically defined group, but also the social status of the nobles they were attached to."

Griots were culturally responsible for knowing their genealogies in speaking and in song, to recite for the nobles. Though they were not considered "upper-class", they were given food, clothing, jewellery, land and slaves for their work." While they could attain high individual status through their work and their social behaviors, their social status as a group was low. They depended economically on the nobles who paid them for their services, they could not attain positions of political power, and they were not allowed to bear arms..." Understanding their role in society is understanding the importance of expression in Senegal. As historians, entertainers, and musicians, griots were influential in many ceremonies, such as weddings, funerals, births, religious parades, and politics, for they used song and speech to recite important information with the usage of praise songs.

== Praise song ==
These praise songs continue to be widely sung, and often express political and religious awareness. Below is an example of a praise song with both political and historical meaning song by a modern-day female artist, Khar M'Baye Maadiaga from the gewel background.

Democracy, democracy,
yes, yes, democracy.
Yes, yes the country wonders
What did you go through, for the land to become meek?

Yes, you went the [right] way, Diouf;
he passed through deliberation,
and by speaking at the right moment.
Yes. What makes a man is courage and seriousness.

Seventeen parties, all in a jumble.
They are shouting, but you keep your dignity.
They are shouting, but you keep your calmness.
It is by calmness that you can rule a country.
But those who came to you also have their merit.
They too hold their country in esteem.
As far as democracy is concerned, Senegal is a model country.

Mbagnik Yacine Baba
Massine Yancie Baba
Caroline Yacine Baba...
Oh Abdou... Madiatou Badara and Mawado
Ndiaye Diouf your father at Guet-Ndar.
So, Elisabeth,
a good wife has to be like you:

== Modern griots and modern music ==
After World War II, there was a rise in the night club scene where more diverse forms of music began to be played by foreigners. Coincidentally enough, Senegal became very much interested in the new form of fashion. However, this allowed non-griots the opportunity to capture persons which was once the job of the griots. While there was much competition between the two, modern day griots used their positions as a way to incorporate modern day music.

While in modern-day Senegal, griots can be placed in three categories. "Those who have decided to refrain from practicing their hereditary profession and have taken up some other occupation; those who continue to perform, without innovation, and those who have managed to find or create a new kind of occupation that still seems to fit the traditional griots' ethos adapting the art of their ancestors to modern requirements and possibilities." The griot's position in society, most relevant to modern day music, are those who use their song and dance as a new kind of occupation while still practicing the traditional legacies of past griots. These individuals are still highly respected for their responsibilities, and have also become incorporated in popular music culture. "Praise songs, far from being superseded, have instead become incorporated into popular music..." Today, "griots have found new meaning for old customs, and new functions for old skills," Although they originated from a caste which held no political power, modern griots still hold much power and status and are better off in life than modern families.

== Hip-hop galsen ==
Following an historical process of appropriation of American popular music by Senegal, (Note: For e.g. Jazz as well as Latin American music such as salsa or pachanga were popular in Senegalese cities from the 1940s and until recently.) hip hop emerged in the Senegalese capital city in the early mid- 1980s. Although hip hop galsen is now famous for its diverse musical productions, the movement there spread out from its dancing appeal rather than from its musical one. Indeed, Senegalese hip hop artists initially participated in this movement as smurfer, breakdancer, B-boy in general performing during organised podiums. Schools, nightclubs and other temporary public stages thus played an essential role in amplifying this movement in Dakar. Besides, and in contrast to American hip hop, which grew from the youth in the inner city ghettos, hip hop in Dakar began among a somehow middle-class youth who was able to access and/or introduce in their home place new ideas and new cultural expressions coming from abroad. Indeed, hip hop became popular in the capital city through the intensive through informal circulation of VH7 cassettes and recorded videos, which were imported from USA (Africa Bambaataa) or France (hip hop dance TV show HIPHOP animated by Sydney) by diaspora people.

Quickly, podiums enlarged their performances from dancers only to rappers as well. It was a time when soon-to-be hip hop artists were still mimicking American artists they actively used to listen to such Africa Bambaataa, Grandmaster Flash, Furious Five, Delight, Doug E. Fresh or Public Enemy for the most well-known. Indeed, rap, the MC performance, was still then a phonetic repetition, a copycatting of either American rappers or, with hip hop booming in France in the 1980s, of French hip hop artists such as Assassin, NTM, IAM or Mc Solaar. Without the real capacity for translating the movement and its expressions in Senegalese terms yet, the mid-1980s in Dakar were however definitively hip hop. And whenever the classical hip hop film Beat Street was circulating in local cinemas, young people were following the movie from showroom to showroom in order to view it again and again and to know by heart the famous lyrics of Grandmaster Flash.

=== Evolution of a culture (1989–1994) ===
Nevertheless, this copycat period did not last long, and getting inspired by the French example, Senegalese hip hop artists soon started to write their own texts in their languages, (Note: Kool Kocc 6 is known for being the first to rap an entire text in Wolof; a song that Baye Fall sings in praise of Serigne Touba (Ahmadou Bamba).) forming groups or collective with school peers and starting to get known and recognised in their neighbourhoods. In 1989, two groups mainly dominated the Dakar scene: Syndikat initiated by Didier Awadi and King MCs led by Duggy Tee. Rather than keeping on challenging themselves, they decided to get together to create Positive Black Soul (PBS) with the desire to promote a positive image of Africa. Indeed, at that time, the first years of the structural adjustments imposed by the IMF had considerably worsened the living conditions of the Senegalese, leaving a limited choice to the younger generations: facing unemployment or, for the wealthier, leaving the country in order to study abroad. A new image, a positive one was most needed and Hip Hop appeared as an emancipating mean of expression for a disillusioned youth. From its dancing expression, hip hop's appeal then definitively moved to its musical expression with artists voicing out the dual anger and hunger of Senegal's younger generations. Through its music form, hip hop stood as a language as well as a message for a youth witnessing injustice, corruption and power abuses from the political elite. Indeed, rapping their disapprobation with the harsh reality they were suffering from was a way for young artists to remind that that, they, as well, could 'represent' the voiceless population.

In late 1980s and beginning 1990s, the capacity for recording and releasing a musical product was still limited for hip hop artists so they were getting known mostly though the circulation of "demos", i.e. instrumental recordings of existing songs on which the young MC could rap. These "instru" or 'demo' were an essential aspect of the development of a soon-to-be hip hop artist as they allowed him to practice his performance, to experiment his "flow", and to try to rap on different rhythms. Moreover, these preliminary products were extremely useful for an artist aspiring to appear on a compilation to present and represent his potential. With respect, the first release of a hip hop production was finally a text of PBS, "Bagn Bagn Beug" on a compilation, "Dakar 92" produced by the French Cultural Centre. Then, after having performed in the first part of MC Solaar's show in Dakar, and with a growing popularity, PBS released "Boul Faalé", a recorded cassette in which the group articulated a vehement discourse denouncing the corruption of the PS (political party) then in power. With this release in 1994, "hip hop galsen" was starting its genealogy. (Note: Abdoulaye Niang, a young researcher at University Gaston Berger of Saint Louis who produced an extensive research on rap in Dakar ("Etude interdisciplinaire du rap à Dakar à travers une approche de la complexité: entre mouvement social et groupe primaire", 2001) stresses that 1994 can be considered as the year differentiating the old school from the new one, the first generation of hip hop artists who started before 1994 and those who started afterwards.)

=== Booming of a generation (1994–2000) ===
From the mid-1990s, hip hop galsen was building a name for itself and becoming more and more visible globally with now well-known hip hop groups such as Daara J, Positive Black Soul (PBS) or, later on, Pee Froiss touring throughout the world. Indeed, pioneer groups of hip hop galsen entered the global scene of the music industry with, in 1994, PBS signing with Island Records and, in 1996, Daara J signing with Declic Communication. Besides, both groups were soon taking care of by internationally known publishers (Polygram-Universal for PBS and BMG for Daara J) and booking agents (MMP for PBS and Furax for Daara J), boosting their respective career worldwide.

Meanwhile, a second "generation" was emerging in Dakar and the local hip hop scene was increasingly getting diversified. By the late 1990s, hip hop galsen had reached its peak with groups and genres booming everywhere alongside an active practice of the 'clash'. (Note: This core and challenging practice of hip hop as a movement was not however always well understood in Dakar and some people used it to improvise themselves as rappers with the only purpose of insulting and criticising other hip hop groups or artists.) Geographically, hip hop galsen was represented in Dakar and in its most popular banlieues, such as Guédiawaye or Thiaroye but also in the regional cities, like Kaolack or Saint Louis. Besides, hip hop as a medium of expression allowed for different messages to be articulated and thus a consequent diversification of genres in the musical productions (from hardcore to mainstream, from politically engaged to more party oriented, from a social to a more individual discourse) as well as in the groups composition with the appearance of the first female figures. In the late 1990s, beginning 2000s, hip hop galsen was definitively coming of age.

== Rappers as "modern-day griots" ==
As detailed in Patricia Tang's article The Rapper as Modern Griot: Reclaiming Ancient Traditions, over the years, both Senegalese and American rappers have labeled themselves "modern-day griots". Many disagree with this assertion because there is such a great contrast between griots and rappers, and the roles they play within society. Griots are musicians or entertainers hired by royalty, or the upper-class, to songs of praise. The subject matter of these songs usually consists of admiration for nobles, but can also include commentary on social issues. However, according to Tang, "although these songs sometimes have moral or didactic messages regarding social behavior, they rarely speak out against specific individuals or institutions." Contrastingly, rappers do not sing praise songs for the upper-class, and they do not sing for money; though they are paid artists, rappers perform their music to convey an important message or because it is their passion. More significantly, rappers, especially those in Senegal, "openly critique politicians and the government." Their songs address important societal issues, spread awareness, and "demand and effect change."

Yet, aside from all these differences, there are specific reasons why rappers today call themselves "modern-day griots". According to rapper, Awadi, this designation of "modern-day griots" is for one reason only: "what we rappers have continued to do, what we have taken from the griots, is from the journalistic side. A journalist engaged in his society." But at the same time, being labeled a griot has other connotations, and it all boils down to musical "authenticity". Griots come from long lineages of griots, the role of griot being passed down generation to generation. Griots thus have history, and this lineage, this great past, is connected with the idea of authenticity, therefore, when rappers assume the name "modern-day griot", they are given part of that history, and their art forms then become more "authentic". For U.S. rappers, it takes a step further because not only are they connecting themselves to the "authenticity" of griots, they are also becoming a part of the history of Africa, which has a much greater cultural history and thus an even greater form of authenticity. For rappers, history has become a legitimizing force, but such a focus on the past also has its consequences. Though giving historical prestige to rappers today, by romanticizing Africa in this way, giving so much emphasis on its history, has placed the continent in the past, almost ignoring its contemporary musical growth.

What sets aside the music of Senegal apart from many other place is its use of instruments. The most widely used instrument that the Senegalese use is the drum. Also, of importance is the language that these artists rap and sing in. Being that Senegal was colonized by the French is why we see some people develop their sound and rap entirely in French. Others choose to rap in Wolof, or English. "Wolof is the most widely spoken language of northern Senegal and it has rich and ancient musical culture performed by hereditary musicians (gewel)." Not to mention the fact that there sound is a collection from previous cultures and music styles infused in the Hip Hop culture. These are just some of the features you will only find in Senegalese Hip Hop.

=== Underground hip hop ===
Of relevance is the powerful underground hip hop that takes place in Senegal. "While mainstream artist address important social and political issues, it is the underground rap artists in Senegal that go the furthest. Some have even addressed the taboo subject of the country's marabouts* and the power and political influence they hold in the country." Now while it may take more time for this artist to be heard by everyone, their music still holds much influential power as these artist take political stances and addresses the issue they are facing. Discouraging enough, though Senegal can be praised for its ecstatic hip hop scene, sadly enough the solo female artist has no place in Hip Hop in Senegal. Though there are a number of female artists within the mbalax music scene, these women are generally a part of a group, and to this day there has not been a release of a solo female rap album. "The only female rap artist to have made an impact on the Senegelese rap scene is ALIF, the country's first all-female rap group." With the strides Senegal is making as a modernized country, only time will tell before the first female solo album is released and praised for its political context, and social advocating for change.

=== Social change through music ===
It was started by Baay Bia who spent more than 10 years using his talent to make people aware about protecting the Senegalese environment. Senegalese hip hop is all about education. Some Senegalese artists use their fame as ways to bring empowerment and social change to the continent of Africa. Senegalese singer-guitarist Baaba Maal is highly acclaimed for his music stardom on a global level, however his contributions as youth emissary for the United Nations has earned him more acclaim in the pursuit for social justice. "For Maal, the solution isn't throwing money at the crises, it is holding governments accountable." Maal knows the ample amount of resources and technology here in America and feels that if we could just spot light these areas, then maybe governments would straighten up.

There is a solo female artist who had released an album, her name is Sister Fa, but that album did not have so much effect in Senegalese Hip Hop market. She was also the wife of Studio Yes' owner. She is living now in Germany and is about to come back to release her second album.

== Development of an economy (2000s–present) ==
For hip hop galsen, coming of age also meant structuring the capacity of the movement to develop, sustain and enhance their cultural productions. Already in 1998, Didier Awadi created from a bedroom, and with a bit of material he bought thanks to his first artist fees, Taf-Taf Production. Although this structure was then informal, it possessed a PA system which allowed on the one hand, hip hop artists to have access to a required material for diffusing their music, and on the other hand, Awadi to further cumulate revenues and to open, in 2003, a formal recording studio, Studio Sankara. Meanwhile, other initiatives were also being taken in order to improve the diffusion of hip hop music such as the creation of hip hop awards by the structure, Optimist Produktion. Created in 2000, this event was first thought of as a talent awards ceremony but few years after its creation it evolved to become one of the most visible hip hop festival in the West African region. Since the emergences of these early musical structures, other festivals and recording studios dedicated to hip hop were developed by artists of the movement in Dakar but also in its banlieues as well as in the Senegalese regional cities. (Note: Festivals : Senerap International (Dakar, 2003) initiated by Awadi; Festival Guedawaye by Rap (Guedawaye) initiated by Fou Malade; Festa 2H (Pikine, 2007) initiated by Matador; Rap-A-Ndar (Saint Louis, 2004) initiated by 10 000Problems; Festival Arts Hip Hop (Kaolack, 2007). Recording studios : Bois Sacre (Daara J Family); Carbone 14 (Alajiman); Urban 44 (Matador); Youngkoungkoung (Fou Malade); Zon'Art; Waliyaane; Yek Sen Kaw (Daddy Bibson); Trinain (Still crew); Def Waref; Def Dara (Gaston); 99 Records (Simon); Sankara (Awadi); War Click (War Click); Almoudo (Fatim from Wa BMG 44)) Meanwhile, TV as well as radio shows and webzines dedicated to hip hop galsen multiplied, increasing the diffusion of the movement and its musical productions. (Note: On Walf TV, Top FM, RFM for TV and radio shows but also webzines such as Boyjump or Kingsize) Besides, this new era also witnessed the coming back on the hip hop galsen scene of hip hop dance, with the revival of b-boy crews such as X-trem BBoys and the creation of the dance festival Kaay Fecc.

Between 2007 and 2009, there was a real booming of new structures created by hip hop artists and motivated by the desire to be locally independent in terms of musical production. These structures are now as diverse as multiple including recording studios, festivals, labels but also associations, graphic design agencies, video production agencies, duplication plants, fully equipped rehearsal rooms, event and communication agencies, PA system rental agencies, street wear brands and designers (inspired by Graffiti artists, i.e. the graphic expression of Hip Hop), and security agencies. These entrepreneurial dynamics of the hip hop artists were consecrated in January 2009 with the launch of THE event of the hip hop galsen community, 72H Hip Hop. This latest initiative collectively organised by these hip hop entrepreneurs (Note: Hip hop structures which were initially part of the organisation committee: Africulturban, Sankara, Younkoungkoung, Weexdunq, Doxanden Squad, Kaay Fecc, Optimist Poduktion, Nubians Enterprise, 99 Records, Baatine Agency, Bois Sacre, Waliyaane, CPAU, Lat 2 Gun.) stands as a three days event putting together conferences, performances, exhibitions, and workshops dedicated to hip hop galsen. Since its marking of the 20 years of the movement, 72H Hip Hop annually celebrates on January 1, 2 and 3rd, the ever promising dynamism of hip hop galsen.

== See also ==
- ALIF (Liberate Attack of the Feminist Infantry)
- AURA (United Artists for African Rap)
- Didier Awadi
- Lord Alajiman (Daara J)
- Baay Sooley (PBS)
- Gee Bayss (Pee Froiss)
- Keyti (Rap'Adio)
- K-ID (Chronik 2H)
- Matador (WA BMG 44)
- Moona
- Simon Bisbi Clan (Jolof 4 Life)
