= Moona =

Moona is a West African rapper. Known for her flow, sharp and poetic lyrics as well as for her active involvement with the youth, Moona is an active member of United Artists for African Rap (AURA) in which she represents her native Benin. Besides, Moona is the only female rapper to have been selected by Africa Unsigned among artists of the continent to receive support for their next production.

== Biography ==
Born on October 10, 1983, Moona, whose real name Awa Mounaya Yanni, is a younger Beninese artist of Senegalese origins, who makes her first steps in Hip Hop in 2004 in Benin. Her musical adventure begins in her family circle with a father, musician but also patron of the art who welcomes at the family house in Cotonou famous artists such as the band Kassav, Rochero and Milia Bell, Aïcha Koné or Edou Bokandé. Influenced in early childhood by musical styles such as ragtime, rhythm & blues, soul, African variety and world music, Moona finally chooses Hip Hop as the privileged expression of her musical creativity.

Trained as a lawyer, it is not without difficulty, but with a lot of determination that Moona manages to combine studies and music. In 2005, she moves to Dakar for her studies, and there she meets with Guisse Pene and Didier Awadi who encourage her to pursue her musical journey. Since then, Moona has been demonstrating her huge potential by participating in several festivals such as Hip Hop Awards, Banlieue Rythme, Afrikakeur, Fête de la Musique, 72H Hip Hop or Waga Hip Hop and by featuring on different mixtapes and albums such as those of Boudor (Negrissim') or Biba (Bideew bou bess). She finally releases her debut album in 2009, A Fleur 2 Mo’ in which she offers a musical ambiance that spans from hip hop to modern music such as coupé-décalé, dancehall, and other backgrounds sonorous softer and muffled.

In 2006, she joined the West African hip hop collective AURA as the Benin representative. In AURA’s musical comedy, Moona plays the role of a young girl working as a street fruit vendor. Beyond reiterating her engagement towards the youth, Moona participated in 2009 in the project “Answers Solutions Knowledge”, a campaign of awareness against the HIV/AIDS initiated by AIESEC Senegal in collaboration with UNESCO-BREDA and for which she became a trainer.

== Discography ==
- 2009 – A fleur 2 Mo’

== Distinction / Affiliation ==
- AURA (United Artists for African Rap)

== See also ==
- Hip Hop Galsen
