= Zeinixx =

Senegalese poet, graffiti artist and activist

- Born: Dieynaba Sidibé; July 2, 1990 (age 35); Thiaroye, Senegal
- Known for: First female graffiti artist in Senegal
- Style: Socially conscious and activist graffiti
- Movement: Senegalese hip hop

Dieynaba Sidibé (born July 2, 1990), popularly known as Zeinixx, is a Senegalese slam poet, graffiti artist and activist.

== Early years and education ==
Sidibé was born in the suburbs of Thiaroye station and grew up in Dakar. When she was a child, she often spent her pocket money on drawing materials. Her mother was against her becoming an artist and so one day she threw away all Sidibé's paints. She wanted her daughter to become a doctor instead. Sidibé however continued painting. Sidibé discovered graffiti on the TV when she was 17. Sidibé was influenced by her father, a calligrapher, who introduced her to the aesthetic possibilities of lettering and script from an early age.

At age 18, she began to develop an interest in hip-hop culture and slam poetry and so she moved into graffiti. In 2008, she stopped studying management studies to devote her time on graffiti. She became a member of the hip-hop community at the Africulturban Center outside Dakar, and there she honed her skills in graffiti painting.

== Career ==
In 2009, at the age of 19, she is known to have become Senegal's first female graffiti artist. Since the beginning of her graffiti career, renowned Senegalese graffiti artist Oumar Diop, AKA Afia Grafixx is known to have mentored her. She knew how to draw and paint but Grafixx showed her how to do lettering with spray paint. As a way of paying homage to Grafixx al Mukhtar, she named herself Zeinixx, which is a fusion of her name Zeina and his name Grafixx. She started taking part in international hip-hop festivals such as FESTA 2H, organized by AFRICULTURBAN, the first urban culture structure in Africa, and FESTIGRAFF, an international graffiti festival. There, she showcased her work in major galleries and exhibition spaces alongside graffiti artists from Senegal and around the world. She is also a member of the DOXANDEM SQUAD, working alongside the graffiti artist Docta.

She has represented Senegal at international graffiti festivals, including the 2011 Meeting of Styles in Casablanca and the 2012 Waga Hip Hop Festival in Burkina Faso.

In August 2021, Sidibé launched Zeinixx Entertainment, an initiative aimed at organizing visual arts workshops for young people. Through this platform, she conducts training sessions, empowering young people, especially young women, to express themselves artistically and engage with social issues.

== Artistic Themes and Impact ==
Sidibé's work often addresses themes of gender equality, environmental awareness, and social justice. She participated in the "Xibaaru Mbedd" (street information) campaign. There, she collaborated with other artists to promote public health messages. For instance, she transformed a neglected wall in Dakar's Colobane neighborhood into a vibrant piece encouraging environmental stewardship. These so-called murals aim to inspire and educate the public. Zeinixx often collaborates with NGOs and civic organizations to produce murals that tackle taboo subjects like domestic violence and reproductive rights.

Sidibé uses her graffiti to campaign for women's rights and to speak out on social and environmental issues. The theme of women is recurrent in her works, which also reflects on the place of women in sub-Saharan African society. Each year, for International Women's Rights Day on March 8, she participates in the Women Life project, a graffiti session organized for the occasion.

Sidibé's contributions to art and activism have garnered international recognition. In 2020, she received the "Award Makers Muse! Kindle Project’s 2020" for her artistic contributions. Her pioneering role has inspired a new generation of female artists in Senegal. Through her workshops and public engagements, she continues to challenge gender norms and advocate for women's rights.
