= Negrissim' =

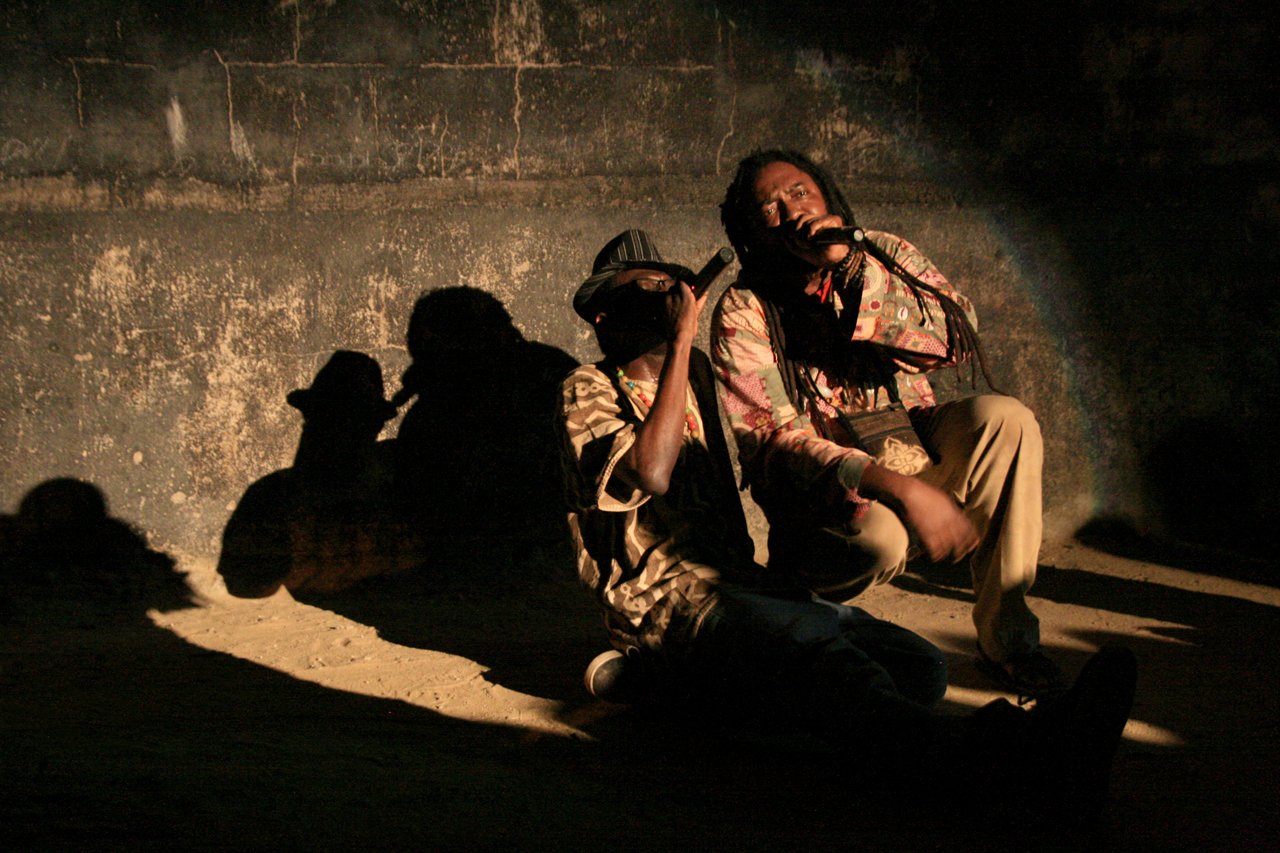
- Sadrak and Boudor during a concert in New Bell in Douala, 2010

Background information
- Origin: Yaounde, Cameroon
- Genres: R&B, Rap
- Years active: 1995–Current
- Members: SadraK; Evindi; Sundjah
- Past members: Boudor
- Website: negrissim.net

Negrissim' is a hip hop crew from Cameroon formerly based in Dakar, Senegal, despite their members travelling regularly between Europe and Africa.

== History ==
It all began in 1995 in Yaoundé where the young rapper SadraK from Douala met the Sassene brothers, Evindi and Sundjah:Negrissim' was formed and started spreading its message of hip hop from the bush all across the globe. Based in Dakar, Senegal since 2002, after 2 years on the road travelling through West Africa and picking up influences and experience along the way, their roots are both Cameroon and France. Their lyrics reflect both the joys and struggles of contemporary life, especially the clash between rural and urban life in Dakar, the melting pot of Africa. The three Kamerounegres have teamed up with Dj Max from France and his rich sample sounds and previous collaborations include MC's like Boudor and Kwalo'o, both from Cameroon.

== Discography ==
Mixtape

- Released: 1999
- Format: CD
- Label: White Label

Appelle ta grand-mère

- Released: 2000
- Format: CD
- Label: White Label

Street tape Cameroun Senegal vol.1

- Released: 2007
- Format: CD
- Label: Darkcell Recordz

Appelle ta grand-mère! – 2009 Bonus Edition

- Released: 2009
- Format: CD
- Label: Negsounds

La Vallée des Rois

- Released: 2009
- Format: CD
- Label: Negsounds

Bantoo Plan Vol 1

- Released: 2012
- Format: CD, Digital
- Label: Negsounds

== Concerts ==
Festivals in Togo, Benin, Niger, Burkina Faso – Ouaga Hip Hop 2 and 5, Festival Banlieue Rythme 2003, Sénégal – Hip Hop Awards 2004, Fête de la Musique 2006, Nancy Jazz Pulsations 2007, Concert at Divan du Monde in Paris feat. Apkass 2007, and many more

== Documentaries ==
Fangafrika – La Voix des Sans-Voix featuring Negrissim by Stay Calm Productions and West African Hip Hop produced and broadcast by TV5 MONDE

== On stage along with ==
Ministère Amer, Positive Black Soul, Pee Froiss, Dakar all Stars and Daara J from Sénégal, Smockey and Yeleen from Burkina Faso, Baponga and Movaizhaleine from Gabon, Apkass and Les Nubians among others.

== Website ==
https://web.archive.org/web/20181011172530/http://negrissim.net/
