= Matador (rapper) =

Senegalese hip-hop musician

- Also known as: Xarale
- Born: Babacar Niang; Pikine, Senegal
- Genres: Hip Hop
- Occupations: rapper, activist
- Years active: 1992–present

Matador (born Babacar Niang), also known as Xarale, is a Senegalese hip-hop artist and a founding member of the Thiaroye group Wa BMG 44. In 2006, he founded Africulturban, a cultural organization based in Pikine, to advocate for marginalised youth in Senegal.

== Early life ==
Matador began his involvement in hip hop as a dancer, at age of 12. In 1992, he co-founded the group Wa BMG 44 with his two school friends, Mokhtar and Gueye (Omar), whose initials form part of the group's name. In 1989, before the release of their first production, the group added "44" in reference to the Senegalese Tirailleurs killed in the Thiaroye Massacre on December 1, 1944. The name is also sometimes interpreted as “Wa Bokk Menmen Guestu”, a phrase in Wolof meaning "All together to think better".

== Music career ==
After their first release, Def Ci Yaw, which spoke out against Senegalese government corruption, Wa BMG 44 toured throughout Europe, gradually building a reputation within the underground hip hop community. In 2002, during a trip organised in Brussels, the group met rapper and producer SMIMOOZ. The following year, they recorded the compilation BXL-DAKAR des millions de mikes à parcourir featuring rappers from Brussels such as Pasco, Vagabond, Uman, Pitcho, Lady N & Catseyes as well as the group Pee Froiss from Dakar.

In 2004, Wa BMG 44 solidified its status in Hip Hop Galsen. After recording the single "44" for African Underground Vol. 1, they returned to Belgium to work on their second full-length release 44 4 Life. Released in 2004, the album included the nationwide hit single "Jox Ma Sa 5."

After several years of touring throughout Europe, Matador returned to Dakar in 2005 to settle there and prepare his first solo album, combining rap and slam. In 2007, he released Xippil Xoll, which received positive reviews from the Senegalese media.

In November 2009, Matador began the Xippil Xol Fagarou Tour, aiming to raise public awareness on HIV/AIDS prevention. He was joined on stage by Simon,Fou Malade,Tigrim Bi, Wa Keur Gui, Syndikate 21,5Kiem Underground, Sen Kumpe, Alien Zik, La Section B, One X, among other Hip Hop Galsen artists.

Following the flooding in Dakar in September 2009, Matador released a music video for his song "Catastrophe", recorded over a beat by AfricanHipHop radio DJ Threesixty, in support of the affected communities.

== Activism ==
Following severe flooding in 2005 that damaged the Thiaroye neighbourhood where he grew up, Matador organized a benefit concert for victims of the flooding. A year later, with the support of the Mayor of Pikine and the director of its cultural centre, Matador established Africulturban, an organization dedicated to the urban youth.

Africulturban hosts a recording studio and a radio station, organizes the annual festival Festa2H, and has founded projects such as Hip Hop Education which works in elementary schools and operates a DJ school, “African Turntablism” led by Pee Froiss DJ, Gee Bayss. Africulturban is also an active member of the organising committee 72H Hip Hop.

== Discography ==
- 1998 – Def ci Yaw
- 2003 – BXL-DAKAR: des millions de mikes a parcourir (Compilation with SMIMOOZ)
- 2004 – 44 4 Life (Senegal release only)
- 2007 – Xippil Xoll (“Seeing with Eyes Wide Open”)
- 2012 - Vox Populi ( La voix du peuple/Voice of the People )

== Distinctions / Affiliations ==
- 2004 – Best Single and Best Album – Hip Hop Awards (Dakar, Senegal)
- 2009 – Best Hip Hop and R&B Artist – Sunu Music Awards (Dakar, Senegal)
- 2010 – Representative of Senegal at Hip Hop Kankpe Festival (Cotonou, Benin)

== See also ==
- Hip Hop Galsen
