= Gee Bayss =

Senegalese DJ

Gee Bayss is one of the pioneer DJs in West Africa. Member of the group, Pee Froiss, he toured throughout the world with his sure-fire turntablism which had crowds jumping whenever the group was performing. Combining solo projects with international tours of the Pee Froiss, Gee Bayss is actively engaged in transmitting his deejaying art to the younger generations.

== Biography ==
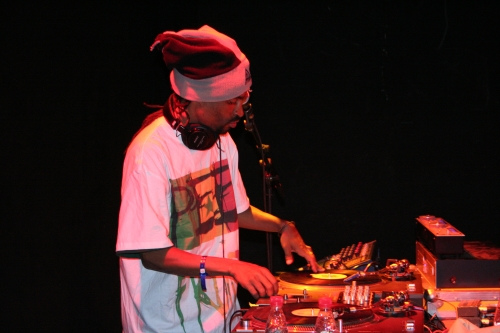
Gee Bayss (Picture by Kulturprojekt21).

Born on April, 23rd 1970, Gee Bayss, of his real name Georges Martin Lopez, made his first steps in music as a club DJ organising and animating special nights in clubs. Early 1990s, he also had a small boutique where he was recording and selling music. With the beginning of Hip Hop Galsen and the creation of Pee Froiss (with Xuman Gunman and Kool Kocc 6), Gee Bayss really starts a career as hip hop DJ, training himself to the art of turntablism. In 1997, Gee Bayss is then one of the first to practice and develop this technical performance of deejaying: he plays music to back up MCs while using turntables and making them scratch to create percussive sounds.

His position of pioneer and leader of turntablism in the region increased the popularity of Gee Bayss beyond the already international recognition of Pee Froiss as one of the flagship groups of Hip Hop Galsen. Although the group has not released any album since 2003, they regularly go on touring together while keeping on developing respective individual projects. With respect, since 2002, Gee Bayss is one of the regular participants invited to the international festival Waga Hip hop in (Ouagadougou, Burkina Faso) to give workshops in turntablism He also participated to the artistic residency of vocal music, "Waka Tibio", which took place during the 2008 and 2009 editions of the festival.

Besides, since 2007, with the creation of the association "Africulturban" (by Matador), Gee Bayss has been directing, in Pikine (Dakar's banlieue), the first school of deejaying, "African Turntablist" which welcomes young people from all over the city. He often holds training and formation on deejaying techniques and regularly accompanies various artists of the Hip Hop Galsen scene apart from Pee Froiss. In 2008, hBee Bayss released his first mixtape, “Egotrip N’ Scratchness”, recorded between Dakar (Senegal) and Nouakchott (Mauritania) inviting famous artists of Hip Hop Galsen, such as Big D, Xuman, Duggy Tee, Nix among others.

== Discography ==
- 1996 – Pee Froiss – Wala Wala Bok
- 1998 – Pee Froiss – Affaire Bou Graw
- 1999 – Pee Froiss – Ah Simm!
- 2001 – Pee Froiss – F.R.O.I.S.S
- 2003 – Pee Froiss – Konkérants
- 2008 – Gee Bayss - Egotrip N'Scratchness

== Affiliation ==
- Waga Hip Hop Festival
- Pee Froiss
- Africulturban

== See also ==
- Hip Hop Galsen
- Matador (WA BMG 44)
