= ALIF (group) =

Female hip hop trio

ALIF (Attaque libératoire de l'infanterie féministe, English: Liberation Attack of the Feminist Infantry) is the pioneer female hip hop trio of Hip Hop Galsen. Emerging in the late mid-1990s, ALIF offered a feminine and feminist flavour to Hip Hop Galsen encouraging women to play their part in the movement. The group split beginning of 2010 after thirteen years.

== Biography ==
In 1997, Myrièm (Marième Diallo), Njaayaa (Ndiaya Gueye) and Oumy (Oumy Ndiaye) created ALIF, the first female hip hop trio emerging on Hip Hop Galsen scene. ALIF initially started like most of Senegalese hip hop artists as dancers first. They were supported by pioneer hip hop artists such as Awadi (PBS), Xuman (Pee Froiss) or the group Daara J. In 1999, ALIF released its debut album, “Viktim”, a production of the Senegalese hip hop label Optimist Produktion. With this cassette, ALIF marks the official entry of women in Hip Hop Galsen.

After several different compilations (Asbef, Dakar Raps) featuring (Awadi, Chaka Bab's), ALIF released its second album in 2004, this time produced by a German label, Out/Here Records. In “Dakamerap”, ALIF reaffirms its constant engagement in favour of the women cause and their rights. They tackled issues such as polygamy and forced marriage, rapping in French, English and Wolof. This second album was greeted with huge success both locally and internationally, allowing the female trio to tour throughout Europe (Germany, Austria, Switzerland, Italy).

In 2006, the group reconfigured itself. Njaayaa left the trio in order to work on solo projects and was replaced by a young singer, Mamy (Ndèye Oumi Mbaye). The group released a third album in 2008. "Rareti" distinguishes itself from the previous productions for its combination of rap and mbalax (popular Senegalese musical genre rendered famous by Youssou N’dour). “Rareti” proved to be the last release of the trio, who announced its separation early in 2010.

== Discography ==
- 1999 – Viktim
- 2004 – Dakamerap
- 2008 – Rareti

== Distinction / Affiliation ==
United Artists for African Rap (AURA)
