= Dakar Flood Drainage Canal =

Flood drainage infrastructure network in Dakar, Senegal

The Dakar Flood Drainage Canal is a major infrastructure project in the metropolitan region of Dakar, Senegal. The canal network was primarily developed to address the severe and recurrent flooding that has plagued the dense suburbs of Pikine, Guédiawaye Dalifort and Yeumbeul, since 2005 .

== History and Context ==
Following devastating floods in 2009 that affected 44% of Pikine’s population and caused an estimated US $42 million in damages, the Senegalese government prioritized flood management . The 2012 presidential election led to a new administration announcing a 10-year, CFA 720 billion flood management plan. The initial phase allocated CFA 66 billion specifically for the construction of drainage canals.

=== Technical Features ===
The drainage system emphasizes "gravitary" flow, allowing water to move naturally towards the sea without reliance on pumping stations. This method reduces maintenance costs and energy dependency.

Project Phase	Key Achievements	Funding Sources
PROGEP 1	23 km of canals, 8 basins (315,000 m³ capacity)	State of Senegal, World Bank, Nordic Development Fund
PROGEP 2	46 km of linear drainage, 30 km of paved roads	World Bank, African Development Bank, Nordic Development Fund

=== Socio-Political Impact ===
The success of the Dakar canals is attributed not only to engineering but also to political activism. Research highlights the role of SAABA (Synergie des Acteurs pour l’Assainissement de la Banlieue), a coalition of youth associations formed in the lead-up to the 2012 elections. These groups used technical knowledge to challenge government policies, shifting the focus from emergency relocation to permanent drainage infrastructure.
