= Kébé =

Kébé is a West African surname that may refer to:

- Ali Ibra Kébé Baye (born 1978), Senegalese footballer
- Alioune Kébé (born 1984), Senegalese footballer
- Boubacar Kébé (born 1987), Burkinabé footballer of Malian descent
- Jimmy Kébé (born 1984), Malian footballer
- Pape Maguette Kebe (born 1979), Senegalese footballer
- Yahia Kébé (born 1985), Burkinabé footballer of Malian descent
