= United Artists for African Rap =

United Artists for African Rap (Artistes Unis pour le Rap Africain, AURA) is a collective of 17 hip hop artists (plus one griot) coming from ten West African countries (Benin, Burkina Faso, Gambia, Guinea, Ivory Coast, Niger, Mali, Mauritania, Senegal and Togo) and who are committed to use their voices and music for Africa’s development. With the support of the Non Governmental Organization PLAN International, they are engaged in a public awareness campaign relating to Children’s rights and youth problems. In 2006 they realized the first ever hip hop musical comedy show “The extraordinary Stories of Poto-Poto Children”.

== Members ==
West African countries.

There are currently 17 members of AURA, originating from 10 West African countries:

Benin	Moona (formerly from the band DCH)
Burkina Faso	Smockey and Smarty (Yeleen)
Gambia	Egalitarian
Guinea	Moussa (Degg J Force 3)
Ivory Coast	Priss K
Mali	JoDama (Tatapound)
Mauritania	Waraba
Niger	Pheno B and Safia (both from the band Kaidan Gaskia)
Senegal	Didier Awadi (Positive Black Soul); Xuman; Myriam (ALIF (Liberate Attack of the Feminist Infantry)); Baay Sooley (Choreograph); Big D; Keyti
Togo	Bobby (Djantakan)

The artists’ underlying philosophy is that of Africanist optimism; they believe that Africa has the ability to overcome all her challenges and they are strongly focused on encouraging youth engagement to this end. They contend that the youth represent the leaders of tomorrow and it is only by engaging Africa’s currently largely marginalised youth population that the continent has a chance of developing.

== Poto-Poto Campaign ==
AURA is currently engaged in a campaign designed to raise awareness about children’s rights and the problems that children are facing on a daily basis. The campaign is called “Poto-Poto”; “Poto-Poto” translates as ‘mud’ and is also the colloquial name for the big African market. It represents the children's home; many of whom are forced to wander the streets, sleeping in the market and eating bits of food that they find there. The Poto-Poto campaign is centred on the production of a music album: “The extraordinary stories of the Poto-Poto children” (“Les histoires extraordinaires des enfants de Poto-Poto”). In this album, each rap artist plays the role of a particular child, be it child soldier, child prostitute, victim of a forced marriage, drug dealer etc. In the songs, the children meet to exchange their stories, to condemn or condone their friends’ ways of life and to ask questions about how such situations came about. The use of rap in this way allows often sensitive topics to be broached in a way that young people are able to understand and relate to.

The songs not only address and raise awareness of problems, but they also portray the courage and humour that these children maintained. Despite the hardships that they are subjected to on a daily basis, they maintain cheerful demeanours, coming together to draw strength from one another and to overcome their problems.

In 2007 two singles from the album were released: “Bienvenue a Poto-Poto” (“Welcome to Poto-Poto”) and “Poto-Poto Dancing”. These were instant hits, taking top spots in music charts across the region of Francophone West Africa. “Bienvenue a Poto-Poto” even made it to number 2 in the music charts on RFI (Radio France Internationale). AURA's music is available to listen to free at their recently developed website: aurahiphop.com.

== Events ==
In addition to the Poto-Poto album, the artists have performed concerts across the region. They theme each concert around a particular issue concerning children’s rights. For example, at the St Louis Jazz Festival in May 2007, the artists sung about the problem of the talibé in Senegal (child beggars). In 2007 they performed at local musical festivals in Senegal (St. Louis Festival, Dakar Banlieue Rhythmes Festival) and played regional concerts in Burkina Faso and Niger. AURA also participated in a school tour in the Netherlands that was organised by Plan Holland; the artists met local students and performed their Poto-Poto songs, drawing attention to Africa's pressing problems.

A concert tour took place in 2008 in Mali, Senegal, Mauritania, Togo, Benin, Ivory Coast and Gambia.

== Discography ==
- 2007 – AURA – The Extraordinary Stories of the Poto-Poto Children (CD)
- 2010 – AURA – Bienvenue a Poto-Poto – Afrolution (compilation)

== See also ==
- Didier Awadi (PBS)
- Myriam (ALIF)
- Keyti (Rap’Adio)
- Moona
- Baay Sooley (PBS)
