= Malick Sall =

Senegalese politician

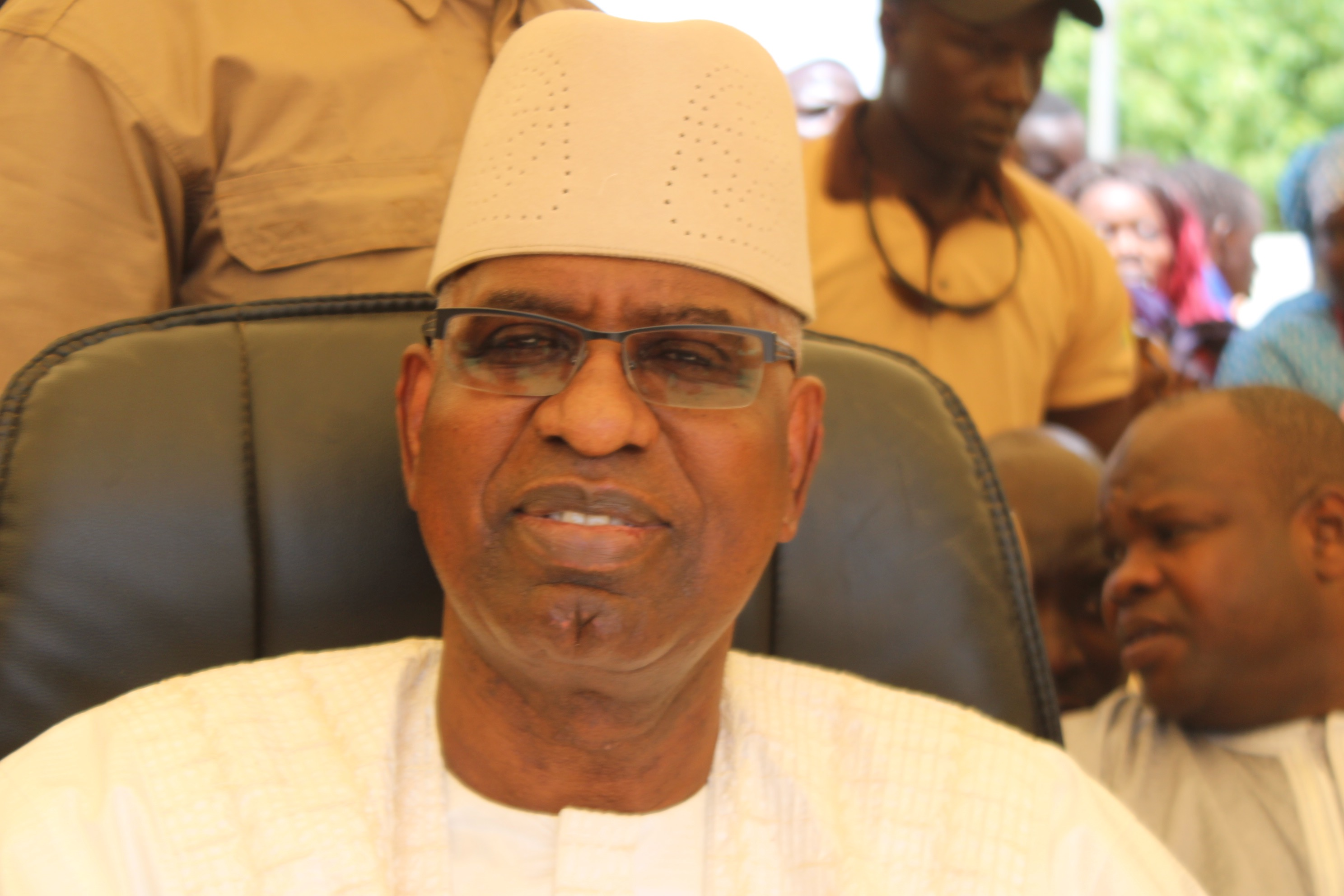
- Malick Sall

Keeper of the seals Senegalese Minister of Justice
- In office 7 April 2019 – September 20, 2022
- President: Macky Sall
- Succeeded by: Ismaïla Madior Fall

Personal details
- Born: 2 April 1956 (age 70) Danthiady, (Senegal)
- Education: Cheikh Anta Diop University
- Occupation: Lawyer, Politician

Malick Sall (born 2 April 1956) is a Senegalese lawyer and politician who served as Senegal Minister of Justice from 7 April 2019 to 20 September 2022.

== Early life ==
Sall was born in Danthiady. He obtained a Master's degree in Private Law (Judicial Law option) in 1981 from the Faculty of Legal Sciences of Cheikh Anta Diop University.

== Political career ==
Sall was appointed as the Minister of Justice under the presidency of Macky Sall in 2019 and served for three years. He was succeeded by Ismaïla Madior Fall in September 2022.
