= Mariama Sarr =

Senegalese politician

Mariama Sarr (born 4 March 1963) is a Senegalese politician. She is currently serving as Minister of Public Service and Public Service Renewal in the Fourth Sall government.

== Career ==
Sarr served as Minister for Women, Children and Women's Entrepreneurship from 2012 to 2013. She is also mayor of Kaolack.
