= K-ID =

Senegalese artist (born 1983)

K-ID (real name Rayane Fakih) is a Senegalese artist and one of the two members of the group Chronik 2H. He stands as one of the hip hop entrepreneur actively contributing to the structuring of the music sector in Dakar. Well known for his talents as musical producer, having realised several tracks and albums for local hip hop artists, K-ID has now intensified his participation in the local music economy with the creation of his structure Oracle Vision Future, specialised in audiovisual production. Through this new initiative, K-ID expresses his desire to give a new and professional impulsion to the Hip Hop Galsen and, the African Hip Hop in general.

== Biography ==
Born on February 16, 1983, in Dakar, K-ID, is originally from Lebanon. While Hip Hop was not particularly popular among the local Lebanese community more inclined to listen to techno and electronic music, K-ID is slowly introduced to Hip Hop thanks to his childhood friend, Black Casanova. Inspired by 2Pac and Biggy but also French groups like IAM or Suprême NTM, K-ID makes his first steps in Hip Hop in 1996 and creates, a year later, with some school friends, the AIPEE (I-P) group. This crew will not last long, but being a talented piano player, K-ID produces in 1998 his first accomplished musical project, a maxi for the group Kantiolis. By then, K-ID has joined Rozo with whom he now forms Chronik 2H.

K-ID distinguishes himself as a prolific and demanded musical producer and between 1999 and 2004, he realises multiple musical productions for many local hip hop artists such as Nix, Abass Abass, Big D or Yat Fu. Meanwhile, he also works actively in developing his own artistic career with his group and releases, in 2004, Chronik 2H’s debut album “Trop de Choses à Dire” (“Too Many Things to Say”). In 2005, motivated by the French Publisher JBA Edition with whom they signed, Chronik 2H releases their first international album, “Hors Serie Volume 1”, on which they collaborate with Jacky Brown (Neg’Marrons), Ste Strauz, Philippe Montero and Big D. K-ID is currently working on the 3rd album of Chronik 2H.

After two years of training in Montpellier in Audiovisual, K-ID creates in 2009 his structure “Oracle Vision Future” specialised in video production, computer graphics, event and artists management. With his newly initiated structure, the objective of K-ID is to give a push in the right direction to the Hip Hop Galsen while increasing the level in offering professional and competitive services of audiovisual productions.

== Discography ==
- 2004 – Trop de Choses à Dire (“Too Many Things to Say”)
- 2005 – HORS SERIE Volume 1

== Distinction / Affiliation ==
- 2006 – Best Video Clip – Hip Hop Awards (Dakar, Senegal)
- 2007 – Nominee – Prix de la Francophonie
- 2010 – Best Hip Hop/Reggae Artists – Kora Awards (Ouagadougou, Burkina Faso)
