= Dagoudane Arrondissement =

- Arrondissement
- Interactive map of Dagoudane Arrondissement
- Country: Senegal
- Region: Dakar Region
- Department: Pikine Department

Area
  - Total: 15 km^{2} (5.8 sq mi)

Population (2013 census)
  - Total: 328,670
  - Density: 22,000/km^{2} (57,000/sq mi)
- Time zone: UTC±00:00 (GMT)

Dagoudane Arrondissement is an arrondissement of the Pikine Department in the Dakar Region of Senegal.

It is divided into 7 communes d'arrondissement: Dalifort, Djida Thiaroye Kao, Guinaw Rail Nord, Guinaw Rail Sud, Pikine Est, Pikine Ouest and Pikine Sud.
