= Christian Sagna =

Senegalese footballer (born 1982)

Personal information
- Full name: Christian Sagna
- Date of birth: November 9, 1982 (age 44)
- Place of birth: Pikine, Senegal
- Height: 1.84 m (6 ft 0 in)
- Position: Striker

Senior career*
Years	Team	Apps	(Gls)
2003	FC Dinaburg	8	(0)
2004–2006	FK Suduva	43	(9)
2006–2008	Petrolul Ploiesti	27	(11)
2008–2009	Gloria Buzău	3	(0)
2009	FCM Târgoviște	4	(0)
2009–2010	Olimpia Râmnicu Sărat	9	(0)
2010–2011	Voltigeurs de Châteaubriant	35	(9)
Total		129	(29)
- * Club domestic league appearances and goals as of 24 August 2019

Christian Sagna (born November 9, 1982) is a Senegalese former football player who played as a striker.
