= Simon Bisbi Clan =

Simon Bisbi Clan is one of the most visible hip hop artists on the contemporary scene of Hip Hop Galsen. After his beginnings in Dakar, Simon grows from his diverse experiences on other hip hop scenes abroad during five years before coming back to his hometown. Since his return, he has been intensively contributing to the development of the musical sector in Dakar with the creation of his LLC (Limited Liability Company), 99 Records, a structure dedicated to the promotion of Senegalese urban music and centred on the label “Djolof 4 Life Entertainment”.

== Biography ==
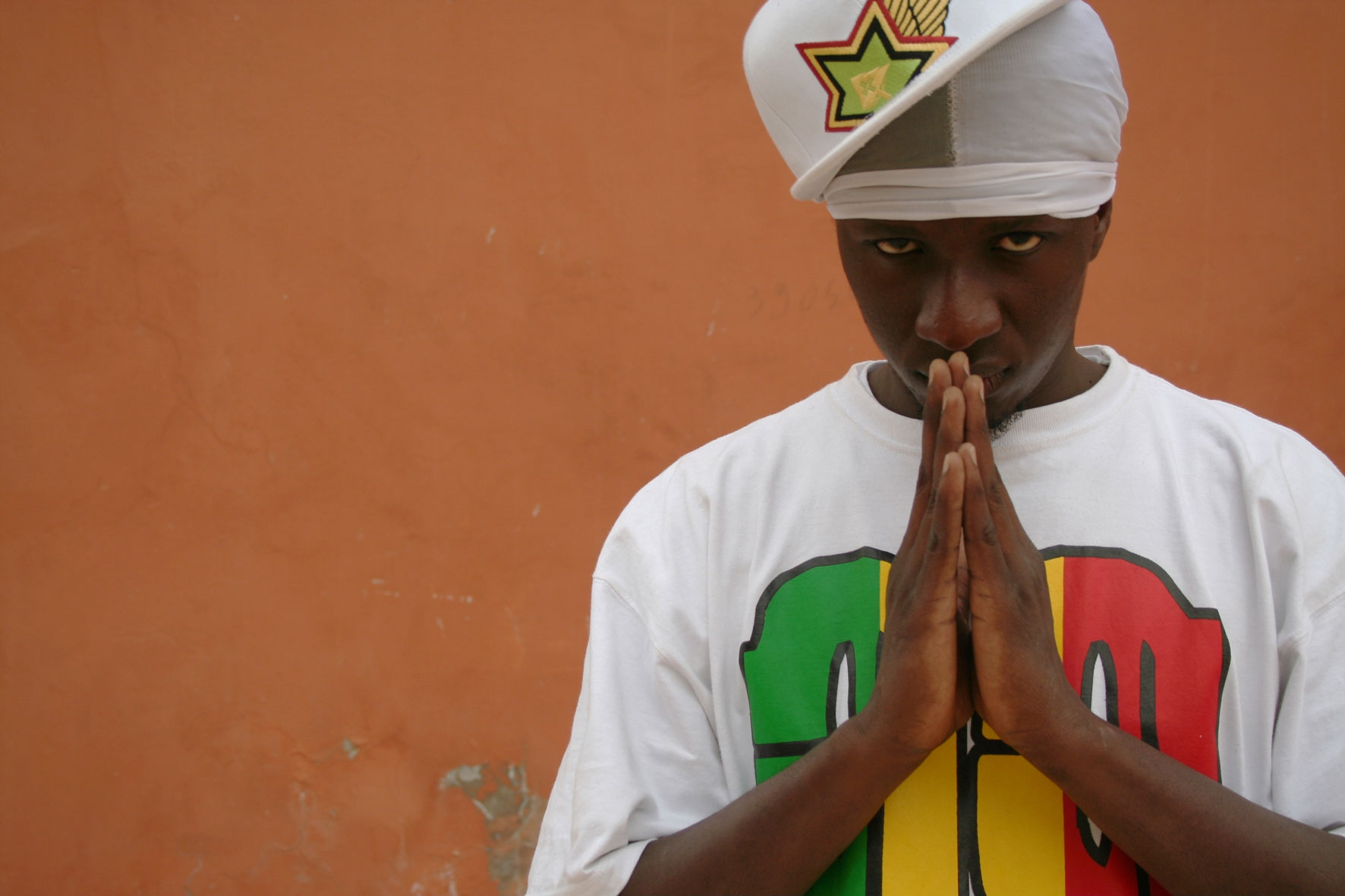
Simon Bisbi Clan (By Sandy Haessner www.greenyezdesign.com).

Born on April, 27th, 1979 in Dakar, Simon Bisbi Clan from his real name, Simon Mohamed Kouka, starts his first steps in Hip Hop in 1997 first as a dancer but quickly as a rapper. Influenced by American and French artists as well as Senegalese hip hop artists from the previous “generation”, Simon creates his group Bisbi Clan with two of his childhood friends, allying both singing and rapping. From then and until 2001, Bisbi Clan multiplies its featuring and appearances on different productions and compilations with tracks such as “Mangui tuddu Hip sant Hop” calling for more unity in the Hip Hop movement and the return to its original values, or “Balla”, a remix of Wycleef's song Diallo, in memory of the student Balla Gaye killed by the police during a manifestation.

In 2002, Simon leaves for Bordeaux to pursue his studies. There, he multiplies stage performances in hip hop as well as in slam and collaborates with various artists both in jazz and in hip hop. He also becomes part of the collective “99 Pro-G” which recently released its first compilation “Hip Hop Resurrection”. Beginning of 2006, Simon releases his debut album, Digue Boor La ("A Promise is a Debt") which allows him to reassess his legacy to Hip Hop Galsen. This first album meets a great success in his home-town, Dakar . End of 2009, after multiple collaborations on albums of local hip hop artists (Wa Keur gui; Sen Kumpë; 5Kiem underground; ResKP), Simon finally releases a mixtape Maxama Mer ("Overwrought") for which he will be touring throughout Senegal from beginning of March 2010.

In 2007, Simon definitively comes back to Senegal in order to create his structure of musical production, 99 Records. This structure is composed of a CD duplication plant, an audiovisual recording studio, an event agency as well as a street wear brand. Besides, 99 Records is centred on Simon’ label, Djolof 4 Life Entertainment which has already produced several other local hip hop artists, such as 5kiem Underground, Sen Kumpe, Zair ak Batine, Tigrim Bi et Big Fa. With his structure, Simon stands as one of the most active members, part of the 72h Hip Hop organisation committee, this three-days hip hop event initiated in 2009 and taking place every year since then on 1–3 January, in Dakar.

== Discography ==
- 2006 – Digue Boor La
- 2007 – Abadane Bagn Katt
- 2009 – Maxama Mer
- 2012 – S-Tape
- 2014 – Leader triple album

== Distinction / Affiliation ==
- 99 Pro-G

== See also ==
- Hip Hop Galsen
