= Lord Alajiman =

Senegalese musician

Lord Alajiman is a Senegalese hip hop artist and entrepreneur. He is one of the member of the now internationally known group Daara J with whom he performed and toured throughout the world until 2008 when the group split. Since then, Alajiman evolves in a solo career while contributing to the development of the music sector in Senegal. In 2009, he created Baatine Agency, a communication agency centred on Karbone 14, which repeatedly organised the shows of Morgan Heritage in Dakar. Citing Cheikh Anta Diop, Alajiman claims to understands the development – one oneself or a sector in general – as ”the acceptance of new elements”.

== Biography ==
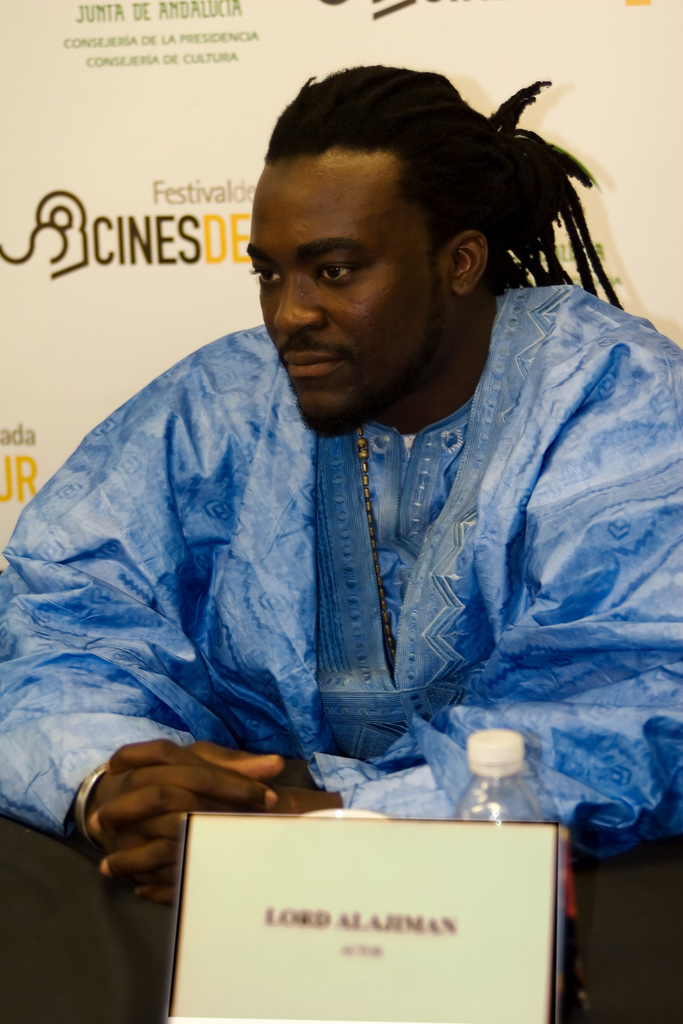
Lord Alajiman by Cines del Sur.

Born on February 16, 1975, Lord Alajiman, from his real name El Hadj Mansour Jacques Sagna, is a child of Médina, the oldest and most active neighbourhood of the city of Dakar. He starts his hip hop career rapping in solo in Dakar until he finally meets with the Lion Clan, a group composed of Faada Freddy and N’Dongo D in the night club Metropolis, now known as Café de Rome. In 1994, the three young artists create their group Daara J, (“L’ecole de la vie” in French, "School of Life") reflecting their experience of traditional Koran schools where young Senegalese learn about life rules, respect and tolerance. The importance of this spirituality as well as an awareness of social and political issues are recurrently found in Daara J’s texts whether they be in French, English or Wolof.

After having signed with the French label, Declic, Daara J releases their debut album, “Daara J” in 1997. They recorded this album in France and had it mixed by Mad Professor. A year later, with an increased popularity both locally and internationally, Daara J releases their second and politically themed album “Xalima” (“Quill”) notorious for its use of traditional African sonorities and its collaborations with internationally acclaimed artists such as Neg’Marrons, Secteur A or Patra. In 2000, Daara J releases in Dakar another album “Exodus” whose track entitled like the album deals with the phenomenon of African emigration motivated by the ideal of fortune and success beyond the seas. Although this album was never released in Europe, the track “Exodus” was however remixed in the third and last album internationally released by the group, “Boomerang”. With “Boomerang”, Daara J toured throughout the world winning awards both in their home country (Hip Hop Awards) as well as abroad, with in 2004 the BBC African Artist Awards.

In 2008, Alajiman starts his solo career while N’Dongo D and Faada Freddy form the Daara J Family. Alajiman is currently preparing his first solo album. Meanwhile, he has been developing his Baatine Agency, a complete communication and event agency which is also a music production label under “Taalif Records”. “Baatine Agency, Emotions Builder” has organisationed several shows of the internationally known reggae band, Morgan Heritage in Dakar (the latest was held in January 2010). This structure possesses one of the highest quality recording music and video studios, “Karbone 14” as well as competitive PA and light system managed by ProSound. Baatine Agency is also a member of the organisation committee of the three-days event “72H Hip Hop”.

== Discography ==
- 1997 – “Daara J” (CD)
- 1998 – “Xalima” (CD)
- 2000 – “Exodus” (cassette exclusively released in Senegal)
- 2003 – “Boomerang”

== Distinctions / Affiliations ==
- 2003 – “Best group”, “Best sales”, “Best cassette – group” and “Best video clip” Awards – Hip Hop Awards (Dakar, Senegal)
- 2004 – “Best African Artist” – BBC Music Awards (London, UK)

== Teranga Blues ==
In 2006, Lord Alajiman played the role of Madike in the movie of Moussa Sene Absa, Teranga Blues. This film raises so many questions that are deeply rooted in real life. Madike is a chilling reminder of the young Senegalese men who are risking their lives taking boats to travel to Europe and carrying the heavy burden of their families' expectations. Upon their return to Africa, the young man who has been abroad is expected to bring back riches, money, gifts, etc. Madike is not able to bring back gifts and wealth, and in order to avoid the disgrace falls into a spiral of money, arms dealing, and death.
