= Moussa Khoume Gueye =

Senegalese footballer (born 1985)

Moussa Gueye
Personal information
- Full name: Moussa Khoume Gueye
- Date of birth: 28 February 1985 (age 41)
- Place of birth: Pikine, Senegal
- Height: 1.95 m (6 ft 5 in)
- Position: Centre back

Youth career
- 2000–2004: Douanes Dakar

Senior career*
Years	Team	Apps	(Gls)
2004–2005	Thakari University		
2005–2008	Douanes Dakar		
2008–2010	Nejmeh SC		
2011	Montana	4	(0)
- * Club domestic league appearances and goals as of June 12, 2011

Moussa Gueye (born 28 February 1985) is a Senegalese footballer who plays as a central defender.

He is the younger brother of Ibrahima Gueye who currently plays for K.S.C. Lokeren in Belgium.

== Career ==
Gueye began his career at Douanes Dakar, before being transferred to the Lebanese Premier League side Nejmeh SC. With the club of Manara he played in the AFC Cup group stage.

On 15 January 2011, Gueye signed a one-a-half-year contract with Bulgarian Montana, joining them on a free transfer.
