= Boomerang (Daara J album) =

Studio album by Daara J
- Released: September 16, 2003
- Genre: African hip hop
- Length: 56:18
- Label: Wrasse
- Producers: Daara J, guest producers

Daara J chronology
| Xalima (1998) | Boomerang (2003) |

Alternative cover
- French release cover

Professional ratings
Review scores
| Source | Rating |
|---|---|
| AllMusic | 4/5 stars |
| Artistdirect | 4/5 stars |

Boomerang (also titled Boomrang in French speaking countries) is an album by Daara J. It was released in 2003 on Wrasse Records. It features musicians such as Rokia Traore, China, Sergeant García, and Desiz LaPeste.

== Track listing ==
1. "Boomrang" (Sagma, Sagna, Seck, Seck, Traore) - 4:18
2. "Esperanza" (Garcia, Sagna, Seck, Seck) - 3:57
3. "Exodus" (Adour, Sagna, Seck, Seck) - 4:02
4. "Bopp Sa Bopp" (Sagna, Seck, Seck) - 3:59
5. "Le Cycle" featuring Rokia Traore (Sagna, Seck, Seck, Taoré) - 4:57
6. "Le Precipice" (Sagna, Seck, Seck) - 4:18
7. "Paris Dakar" featuring Disiz La Peste (LaPeste, Sagna, Seck, Seck) - 4:43
8. "Hip Hop Civilization" featuring China (Moses, Sagna, Seck, Seck) - 3:56
9. "Number One" (Bacjelet, Faye, Sagna, Seck) - 4:00
10. "Si La Vie N'est Pas Belle" (Sagna, Seck, Seck) - 3:21
11. "Babylone" (Sagna, Seck, Seck) - 3:31
12. "Magg Dan" (Sagna, Seck, Seck, Soudin) - 4:48
13. "Esperanza" featuring Sergeant Garcia (Garcia, Sagma, Sagna, Seck, Seck) - 6:24

== Personnel ==
- Aladji Man – Vocals
- David Aubaile – Flute
- Yona Azoulay – Art Direction
- Quentin Bachelet – Arranger, Programming, Producer, Brass
- Balbino – Guitar, Vocals, Choir, Chorus
- Marc Berthoumieux – Accordion
- Vincent Chavagnac – Saxophone
- China – Vocals
- Daara J – Arranger, Programming, Producer
- Disiz la Peste – Vocals
- Faada Freddy – Vocals
- Adamson Faye – Arranger, Programming, Producer
- Christian Fourquet – Trombone
- Sergent Garcia – Arranger, Programming, Vocals, Producer
- Hector Gomez Guilbeaux – Vocals, Choir, Chorus
- Patrice Kung – Mixing
- Youri Lenquette – Photography
- Frank Loriou – Graphic Design
- Anthony Marciano – Art Direction
- Ivan Darroman Montoya – Percussion
- Eric Mula – Trumpet, Arranger
- Eric Mulat – Trumpet
- Jean François Oricelli – Guitar
- Papa Jubee – Arranger, Programming, Producer, Engineer
- Patson – Engineer
- Juan Carlos Petit – Bass
- Paul Scemama – Mixing
- Toma Sidibe – Percussion
- Laurent Vernerey – Bass
- Christophe Appel - sound/live
