= Zourdine Thior =

Senegalese footballer (born 1997)

Personal information
- Full name: Zourdine Mouhemed Thior
- Date of birth: 9 July 1997 (age 29)
- Place of birth: Pikine, Senegal
- Height: 1.70 m (5 ft 7 in)
- Position: Winger

Team information
- Current team: Vilanova

Youth career
- Real Sociedad

Senior career*
Years	Team	Apps	(Gls)
2015–2018	Real Sociedad C	70	(13)
2018	→ Peña Sport (loan)	5	(0)
2018–2020	Real Sociedad B	48	(7)
2020	Académico de Viseu	1	(0)
2021	Real Unión	15	(4)
2021–2022	Andorra	16	(1)
2022–2023	Logroñés	28	(1)
2023–2024	Badalona Futur	19	(3)
2024	Mollerussa	12	(3)
2025	Toledo	13	(0)
2025–	Vilanova	7	(3)
- * Club domestic league appearances and goals as of 8 November 2025

Zourdine Mouhemed Thior (born 9 July 1997) is a Senegalese footballer who plays mainly as a right winger for Spanish Tercera Federación club Vilanova.

== Career ==
Thior is known for his speed, started his career with Spanish La Liga side Real Sociedad. He moved from Senegal to Orio, Basque Country, at a young age. His father is a fisherman.
