= Baay Sooley =

Baay Sooley is a hip-hop dancer from Senegal. He has toured internationally as a dancer of the Positive Black Soul (PBS) crew. He choreographed the hip hop musical comedy "The Extraordinary Stories of the Poto-Poto Children". and created the street wear brand "Bull Doff".

== Biography ==
Sooley (real name Souleymane Diagne) grew up in an environment surrounded by dance (his father worked at the Théâtre national Daniel Sorano in Dakar, Senegal), and at a young age began performing with his elder brother. With the arrival of Hip-Hop movement to Dakar, Sooley became the first professional hip-hop dancer and became the official dancer of PBS. When PBS disbanded in 2001, Sooley formed a new group "PBS Radikal".

While well known for his dancing talents, Sooley surprised many members of the Senegalese Hip Hop Galsen movement when he released his debut album "Ndol" in 2004, mixing various musical styles including hip hop, reggae, ragga, and dancehall.

Between 2005 and 2006, Sooley returned to dance and choreographed the first hip hop musical comedy, “The Extraordinary Stories Of The Poto-Poto Children” performed by the members of AURA (United Artists for African Rap). The show has toured throughout West Africa.

In 2008, Sooley launched his own line of street wear clothing called "Bull Doff".

== Discography ==
- 2004 – Ndol
