= Thiaroye Arrondissement =

- Arrondissement
- Interactive map of Thiaroye Arrondissement
- Country: Senegal
- Region: Dakar Region
- Department: Pikine Department

Area
  - Total: 31 km^{2} (12 sq mi)

Population (2013 census)
  - Total: 343,000
  - Density: 11,000/km^{2} (29,000/sq mi)
- Time zone: UTC±00:00 (GMT)

Thiaroye Arrondissement is an arrondissement of the Pikine Department in the Dakar Region of Senegal. The seat lies at Thiaroye.

It is subdivided into 5 communes d'arrondissement; Diack Sao, Diamaguène Sicap M'Bao, M'Bao, Thiaroye sur Mer and Thiaroye-Gare.
