= Keyti =

- Born: Cheikh Sène; 22 December 1972 (age 53)
- Origin: Senegal

Keyti is one of the first and most prominent hardcore hip hop artists in Senegal. With his group Rap’Adio, he offered a radical approach to Hip Hop Galsen violently recalling the initial purpose of hip hop as a means to denounce society’s flaws. Still radically critical, though less hardcore, Keyti now evolves in solo. He is part of the West African hip hop collective AURA (United Artists for African Rap) and performs in its well-known musical comedy The Extraordinary Stories of Poto-Poto Children.

== Biography ==
Born on 22 December 1972, Keyti, real name Cheikh Sène, is one of the first hardcore rapper emerging in the late mid-1990s in Senegal. He is one of founding members of the notorious hardcore trio Rap’Adio with Iba and Bibson.

In 1998, the group released its debut album Ku Wéét Xam Sa Bopp (“Solitude teaches who we are”), which violently attacks all the established bands while accusing them of having distorted the initial purpose of hip hop, that is to address society's flaws. Rap'Adio members see themselves as the 'soldiers of the street' who use rap as a mean to denounce the harsh reality of those struggling with little means. In 2001, they released their second album, Soldaaru Mbed (Street soldiers) which denounced the problems of Senegalese society while using a hardhitting moralising tone. However, Rap'Adio could not survive the strong personalities and divergent beliefs of its members and eventually split.

Keyti went on with his solo career and, in 2003, he released his first solo album: Jog ak Daanu (Highs and Lows). In this eight-track album, Keyti takes a less stringently moralising tone while, nonetheless, continuing to criticize the difficulties that youth faces, as well as the derives of political power and money. Musically speaking, Ibou N'Dour (Youssou N'Dour's brother) and the keyboard player from Viviane N'Dour's group contributed to the album. Keyti is currently preparing his second solo album. Since 2006, Keity has joined the West African hip hop collective AURA (United Artists for African Rap) as one of its Senegalese representatives. In AURA's musical comedy, The Extraordinary Stories of Poto-Poto children, Keyti interprets Mamadi, a young boy chronically ill striving to survive in a health system ruled by money. Besides, Keyti actively participates in various media projects on Hip Hop Galsen.

In 2013, he was part of a news program aimed at Senegalese youth, Journal Tele Rappe, where the presentation was rapped. He also supported and Amnesty International campaign against impunity in Senegal with the release of a single, "100 Coupables: Impunité! Nous Avons besoin de Justice" ("100 Guilty: Impunity! We Need Justice").

== Discography ==
- 1998 – Rap’Adio – Ku Wéét Xam Sa Bopp
- 2001 – Rap’Adio – Soldaaru Mbed
- 2003 – Keyti – Jok Ak Danuu

== Affiliation ==
AURA (United Artists for African Rap)

== See also ==
- Hip Hop Galsen

== Sources ==
- Ndaw Faye, Babacar. "L'année 2007, un tournant pour le rap galsène". L'Observateur. Archived from the original on 12 June 2010.
- Rapping the news
- Rapping The News In West Africa
- Senegal hip-hop duo rap news of Barack Obama's visit on 'Journal Rappé'
- Hip Hop African Podcast: Xuman and Keyti on Hip Hop Culture in Senegal
