= Amadou Hott =

Senegalese economist and investment banker

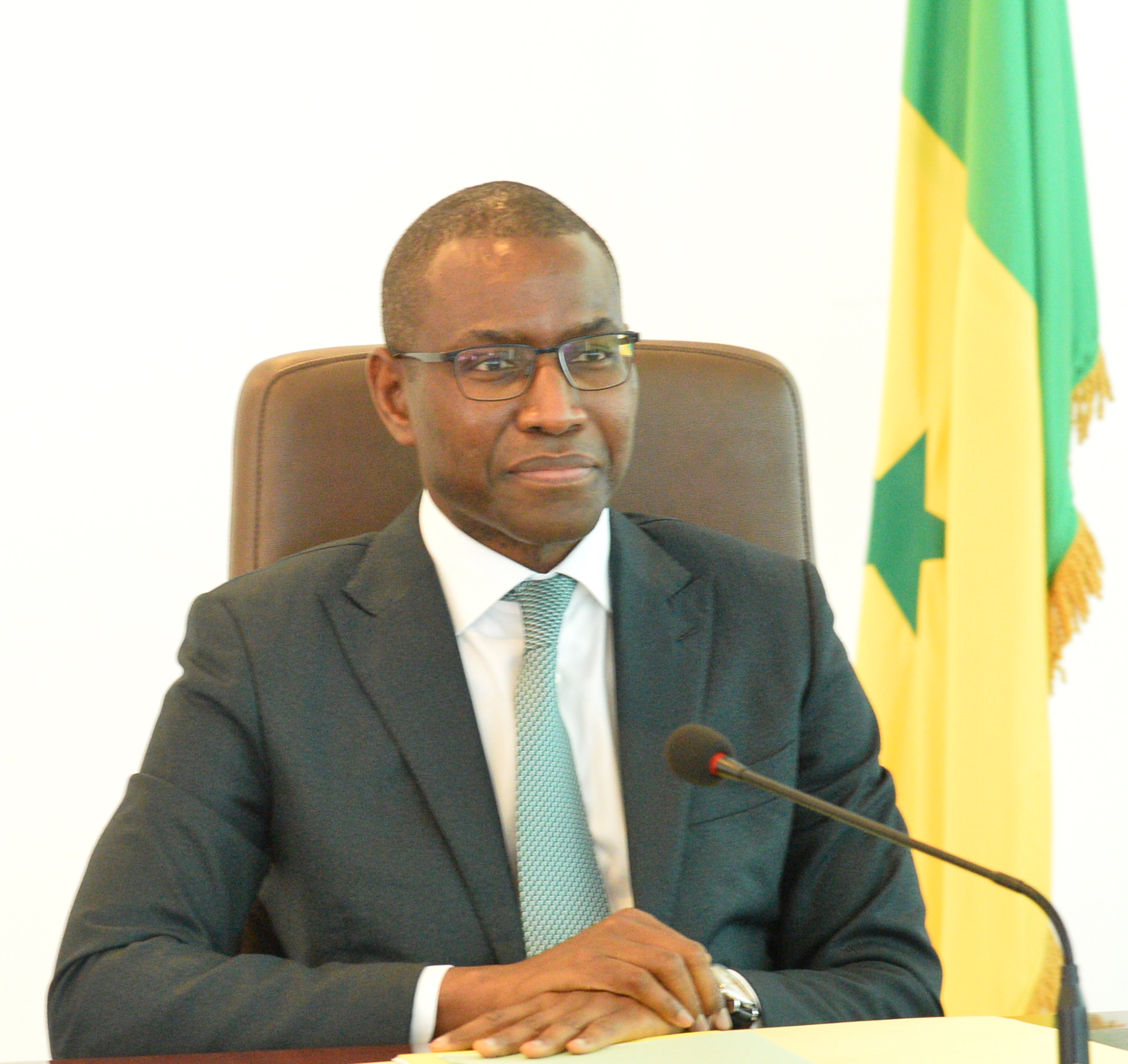
- Amadou Hott

Former Special Envoy of the President of the African Development Bank (AfDB) for the Alliance for Green Infrastructure in Africa, candidate for the Presidency of AfDB
- Incumbent
- Assumed office December 2022

Personal details
- Born: Amadou Hott; 25 October 1972 (age 53) Thiaroye, Senegal
- Education: Louis Pasteur University; Pantheon-Sorbonne University

Amadou Hott (born 25 October 1972) is the former Special Envoy of the President of the African Development Bank for the Alliance for Green Infrastructure in Africa. He was a candidate for the Presidency of the African Development Bank. He is a Senegalese economist and investment banker, and served as Minister of Economy, Planning and International Cooperation of Senegal in the Fourth Sall government from April 2019 to September 2022.

He was formerly the Vice President of the African Development Bank's Power, Energy, Green Growth and Climate Change Complex, a position he held from November 2016 until his Senegalese government appointment. Hott's career has spanned more than 20 years in areas including structured finance, sovereign fund management, investment banking, fundraising, infrastructure and the development of integrated energy solutions.

== Early life and education ==
Hott was born in Thiaroye Gare and spent his youth in the suburbs of Dakar. He completed his primary and secondary education at Khaliy Madiakhaté Kala primary school in Guédiawaye (formerly Ecole 25) and Pikine Est secondary school, respectively. In 1992, he obtained his baccalaureate in Maths at the Seydina Limamoulaye high school in Guédiawaye.

After graduating from high school, Hott enrolled at the Louis Pasteur University in Strasbourg where he obtained an Associate Degree in Applied Maths and a Bachelor of Science in Economy at Pantheon Sorbonne University. He then completed a postgraduate degree in financial markets finance and banking management at the Pantheon-Sorbonne University and subsequently enrolled in a master's degree program in applied mathematics at New York University (NYU) through an academic exchange program.

== Career in the private sector ==
Hott started his career at Société Générale in New York before joining BNP Paribas in London as an investment banker. He then worked at the Dutch bank ABN AMRO where he focused on the African continent. His areas of intervention spanned from risk management to mergers and acquisitions and from advisory to fundraising and financing.

In 2006, Hott left Europe to settle in Dubai where he worked at the Millennium Finance Corporation as a Managing Director working in mergers and acquisitions and financing for the African continent. Two years later, Hott became Managing Director of UBA Capital, the Investment Banking arm of the UBA Group in Lagos.

In 2011, he became the wealth manager for Nigerian businessman Aliko Dangote.

== Career ==
In 2012, Hott was appointed Special Advisor to the President of the Republic of Senegal, Macky Sall, in charge of financing and investment issues, and then chairman of the Board of Directors of AIBD (Blaise Diagne International Airport). In September 2013, he became the first Managing Partner of Senegal's Sovereign Wealth Fund (FONSIS), a new organization he was tasked with building.

Hott became vice-president in charge of the African Development Bank's activities in the areas of Power, Energy, Climate and Green Growth for both public and private sectors in November 2016. During his tenure, the Bank increased investments in renewable energy. In 2017, 100% of the investments in production were in renewable energies. Hott launched programs including “Desert to Power,” the Africa Financial Alliance on Climate Change and the “Green Baseload” under the SEFA 2.0 program.

=== Minister of the Economy, Planning and Cooperation ===
Since April 2019, Hott has been Minister of the Economy, Planning and Cooperation of Senegal. As minister, he is responsible for the preparation and implementation of economic and financial policy, development planning, population, statistics, international cooperation and developing private sector and public-private partnerships.

Public-Private Partnership (PPP) Reforms

Hott initiated a major reform of the public-private partnership framework, aiming to attract more private investment in national infrastructure. This reform helped strengthen the transparency and efficiency of PPP projects, thus facilitating the development of key sectors such as energy, transport, and health. Hott implemented measures to improve the business environment in Senegal.

International engagement and cooperation

As minister, Hott strengthened Senegal's economic relations with various international partners. He participated in several global economic forums, promoting investment opportunities in Senegal and West Africa.

In December 2022, Amadou Hott became a special envoy of the president of the African Development Bank.

=== AfDB presidential candidacy ===
In November 2024, Amadou Hott officially launched his candidacy for the presidency of the AfDB.

== Other activities ==
- ECOWAS Bank for Investment and Development (EBID), Ex-Officio Member of the Board of Governors (since 2019)
- World Bank, Ex-Officio Alternate Member of the Board of Governors (since 2019)

== Awards & volunteering ==
Hott was nominated Young Global Leader by the World Economic Forum in 2012.

Since 2015, Hott has been a member of the Selection Committee for the Tony Elumelu Foundation which supports the $100 million African entrepreneurship program.

As a volunteer for the United Nations Development Programme TOKTEN (Transfer of knowledge through expatriate nationals) programme, Hott was a lecturer in finance at Gaston Berger University in Saint-Louis Senegal in 2004 and 2005.
