= Abdoulaye Niang =

Senegalese footballer (born 1983)

Personal information
- Date of birth: 9 January 1983 (age 43)
- Place of birth: Pikine, Senegal
- Height: 1.92 m (6 ft 3 1/2 in)
- Position: Midfielder

Senior career*
Years	Team	Apps	(Gls)
2004–2006	Pau	49	(4)
2006–2008	Louhans-Cuiseaux	35	(7)
2008–2009	Kavala	7	(0)
2009	Ethnikos Achna	9	(0)
2009–2012	Sorrento	24	(0)
2012–2013	Amiens	15	(2)
2013–2014	Pau	25	(0)
2014–2015	Pontivy	11	(0)
2015–2016	Stade Bordelais	10	(0)

International career
- Senegal U23
- * Club domestic league appearances and goals as of 16 June 2024

Abdoulaye Niang (born 9 January 1983) is a former Senegalese footballer.

== Biography ==
In December 2009, he was signed by Italian club Sorrento. Due to his French nationality, he is not affected by the ban of international signing of non-EU players of Italian lower divisions clubs. In May 2010 he signed a new 1-year contract with club.
