= Answers Solutions Knowledge =

Answers Solutions Knowledge (ASK) in Morocco is one of the four departments of the Moroccan branch of Association des étudiants en sciences économiques et commerciales (Association of Commercial and Economic sciences students). Each year AIESEC chooses a socio-cultural theme globally and implements it locally.

== History ==
AIESEC Morocco was founded in 1986 and came into existence at the Graduate School of International Management (ESIG) in Casablanca. It is based at the Supinfo school.

== 2009 campaign ==
In 2009 the organisers chose to organise a campaign to warn youth against the dangers of HIV and AIDS. According to them, taboos are being broken, and the Moroccan youth is sufficiently mature and open to be warned about subjects such as sexuality, dangerous practices, and drug abuse.

Six schools in Rabat (Moulay Youssef, Ben Mbarek, Zahra, Stwaki, Dar Essalam, Les Orangers) and four in Casablanca (Al Jabr, Lyautey, Mohammed V and La Résidence) have been chosen to participate. Battouma, a member of AIESEC-Anfa, whose premises are located at the Supinfo school said: "We want to make things more fun by having them explained by young people, but by being direct".

Operation ASK 2009, organised by youngsters for youngsters, is divided into four phases over three months. From 1 January to 16 January, the AIESEC welcomes young specialists who are to work with the schools. Battoum adds, "Because these youngsters are themselves students, and are from far afield, this can only better capture the attention of our students". The campaign was launched with an opening ceremony on 17 January at the Bibliothèque nationale de Rabat (National Library in Rabat) and continued until 18 April at the closing ceremony.

Many training sessions have been held for international and local specialists aged between 18 and 25. More than 100 students are being taught to become binome trainers. In partnership with YPEER, the network of binome trainers organised a conference 14 February on AIDS and youth in the ESCA, facilitated by Abdessamad, a young teacher from YPEER/ALCS (Youth Peer Education Network/American Council of Learned Societies) as part of the training programme. A second conference was held 7 March, focusing on the vulnerability and the changes of behaviour in youth.

The closing ceremony was held in the form of plays, realised by the students themselves, with the objective of making youngsters react and to implicate all of the actors concerned in this debate.
