= Pikine department =

Coordinates: 14°45′01″N 17°23′59″W

Pikine
- Department
- Location in the Dakar Region
- Country: Senegal
- Region: Dakar region
- Capital: Pikine

Area
  - Total: 42 km^{2} (16 sq mi)

Population (2023 census)
  - Total: 758,554
  - Density: 18,000/km^{2} (47,000/sq mi)
- Time zone: UTC+0 (GMT)

Pikine department is one of the 46 departments of Senegal and one of the four which make up Dakar region. Its capital is Pikine.

The department is divided into two arrondissements, each subdivided into communes de arrondissement:

- Dagoudane Arrondissement:
  - Dalifort
  - Djidah Thiaroye Kaw
  - Guinaw Rail Nord
  - Guinaw Rail Sud
  - Pikine Est
  - Pikine Nord
  - Pikine Ouest
- Thiaroye Arrondissement
  - Diamaguène Sicap Mbao
  - Thiaroye-Gare
  - Thiaroye-sur-Mer
  - Thiaroye-Diaksao
  - Thiaroye-Mbao

Population

In the census of 2023 the population of the department was recorded at 758,554.

Historic sites

- Military Cemetery at Thiaroye
