= Didier Awadi =

Senegalese rapper

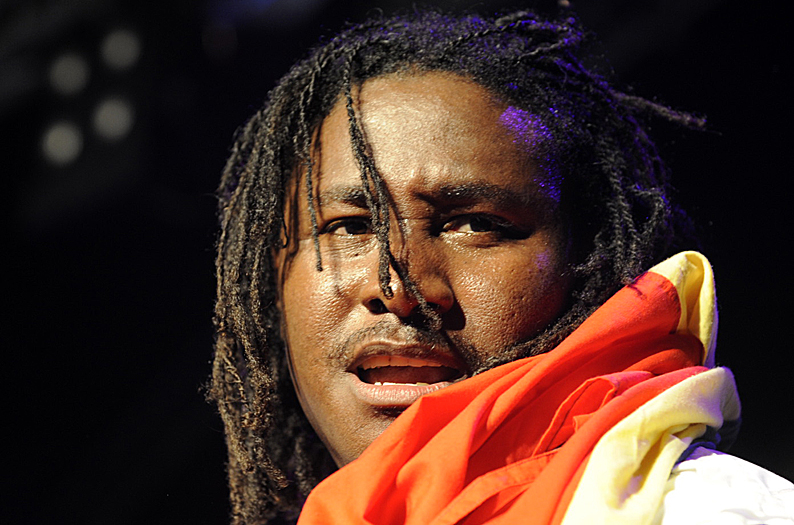
- Awadi in 2009
- Born: Didier Awadi; August 11, 1969 (age 56); Dakar, Senegal
- Other name: DJ Awadi
- Occupations: Rapper; Director
- Years active: 1984-present
- Musical career
- Genres: African hip hop
- Instrument: Vocals
- Label: Mr Bongo Records
- Member of: Positive Black Soul

Didier Awadi is a Senegalese rapper and a significant figure in Francophone West African hip hop. As a founding member of Positive Black Soul (PBS) with Duggy Tee, Awadi toured around the world contributing to the international popularity of Hip Hop Galsen. Awadi works as a solo artist, accompanied by his crew PBS Radikal. He participates in the Senegalese music industry through his label, recording studio, and rehearsal space, Studio Sankara. Awadi offers a conscious and revolutionary style of music strengthened by articulated and rooted messages. His motivation and inspiration is grounded in the Burkinabé revolutionary Thomas Sankara's phrase: "Let's dare to invent our future!"

== Biography ==
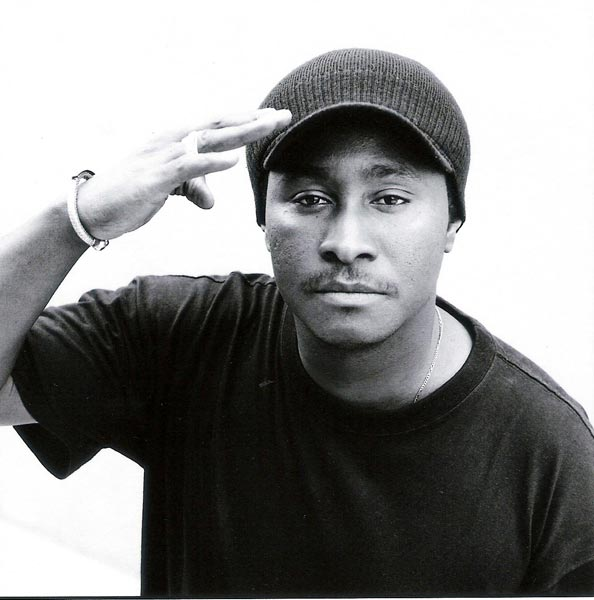
Didier Awadi (Photo by Seneweb).

Born on August 11, 1969, in Dakar, Senegal, Awadi is of Beninese and Cape Verdean descent. In 1984, while hip hop was slowly emerging on the Dakar scene, Awadi created the group Syndikat. In 1989, he formed Positive Black Soul with fellow hip hop musician Duggy Tee with the desire of promoting a positive image of Africa. In 1992, PBS was chosen by the French rapper with Senegalese origins, MC Solaar, to be the first part of his show touring throughout France. With a growing popularity, they recorded in 1994 their first track "Boul Faale," ("Don't worry") in which they denounced the corruption of the local political system. This track became part of their first album, "Salaam" released in 1995 after a European tour and signed under the label, Island Records. Over the next fourteen years, PBS had multiple international collaborations (KRS-One, Mc Solaar, Princess Erika, K-Mel, Kimani Marley, etc.) and toured worldwide while releasing K7 and CD in Senegal and internationally. Throughout his career, as member of PBS and later as a solo artist, Awadi articulated a militant and critical discourse in favour of a brighter pan-African future.

In 2001, the two members of PBS decided to start a solo careers. A year later, Awadi released his first solo album, “Kaddu Gor” ("Word of Honour") which received the Radio France Internationale (RFI) World Music Award in 2003. After announcing the formation of his new crew, PBS-Radikal with Baay Sooley, Carlou D, and Noumounda Cissoko, Awadi signed with Sony Music. In 2005, he released his second solo album, “Un Autre Monde est Possible” (“Another World is Possible”) in which he called for the emergence of a better society based on equity, fairness, justice, and freedom. In 2006, he released “Sunugaal”, a plea for the development of Senegal and against illegal immigration. In October 2007, Awadi presented his upcoming project, “Presidents of Africa” on the Bataclan (theatre) stage in Paris, with artists from all over the continent. This fourth album was released in April 2010.

In 1998, Awadi began contributing to Dakar's musical industry with the creation of his first home studio, "Taf-Taf Production" ("quickly" in Wolof - but "well-done" as Awadi stresses) and the first rental of his PA system. In 2001, he produced a one-hour TV show mirroring the local hip hop culture, "Senerap". In 2003, he created a festival dedicated to the hip hop culture, "Senerap International". That same year, "Taf-Taf Production" became "Studio Sankara", a more formal and professional music production structure actively producing advertising spots. In 2009, as a joint initiative with music professionals and hip hop artists, Awadi organized the first edition of "72H Hip Hop", a three-day event celebrating Hip Hop Galsen through workshops, conferences, performances, and exhibitions.

== Discography ==
PBS cassettes released in Senegal between 1994 and 2001:

- Boul Falé
- Boul Falé Bou Bess
- Daw Thiow
- Fo Deuk
- New York / Paris / Dakar
- Wakh Feign
- Révolution 2000

PBS CD released internationally between 1995 and 2001:

- 1995 – Salaam
- 1997 – New York / Paris / Dakar (released in Europe in 2003 only)
- 2001 – Run Cool

Awadi solo albums – from 2002 up to nowadays:

- 2002 – Kaddu Gor
- 2005 – Un Autre Monde est Possible
- 2006 – Sunugaal (released in Europe in 2009)
- 2010 – Presidents of Africa
- 23 April 2018- Made in Africa

== Distinctions / Affiliations ==
- 2003 – RFI World music award
- 2004 – Best African rapper – Tamani Awards (Mali)
- 2005 – Chevalier des Arts et des Lettres – France and Senegal
- AURA (United Artists for African Rap) member and actor in the first West African hip hop musical comedy show “The Extraordinary Stories of Poto-Poto Children” in which he represents the soldier-child

== Filmography ==
Awadi was the subject of a film, United States of Africa, directed by Yanick Létourneau in 2012.. The film was the Critic's Choice Award at the 2011 RIDM Festival Montreal.

== See also ==
- Hip Hop Galsen
- Positive Black Soul (PBS)
- AURA (United Artists for African Rap)
- Senegalese hip hop
- Music of Senegal
- African hip hop
