= Pikine =

City in Senegal

- City
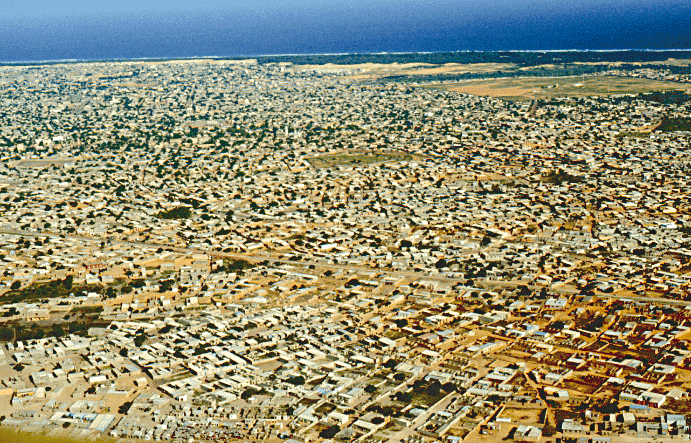

- Location within Senegal
- Coordinates: 14°45′0″N 17°24′0″W
- Country: Senegal
- Region: Dakar Region
- Department: Pikine

Area
  - Total: 87 km^{2} (34 sq mi)

Population (2015)
  - Total: 1,170,791
  - Density: 13,000/km^{2} (35,000/sq mi)
- Demonym: Pikinois
- Time zone: UTC+0 (GMT)

Pikine is a city and the capital of the Pikine department, in the Dakar region in Senegal. The largest suburb of Senegalese capital Dakar, as of the 2013 Census, it had a population of 1,170,791. It is the second-largest city in Senegal, behind Dakar.

== History ==
Situated on a former French military base, illegal immigrants were sent to the site of Pikine in the early 1950s to ease a growing housing crisis in the Cap-Vert. Incorporated by colonial officials in 1952, the community's fast growth caused it to surpass its legal boundaries and urbanize, and had a population on 50,000 by the end of the 1950s.

More people moved to the city from eastern rural towns during the 1970s for job opportunities, growing from 30,000 people in 1960, to 650,000 by 1988.

Since the 1980s, the city has been unzoned. In 1998, Pikine was described by essayist Gérard Salem as a city "without a real history".

Pikine is separated into two: 'regular' Pikine, and 'irregular' Pikine. 'Regular' Pikine encompasses development before the 1970s, while 'irregular' Pikine are the post-1970s shanty town.

The Mbeubeusse Landfill, the Dakar region's sole waste facility, is situated in Pikine.

== Healthcare ==
Healthcare in Pikine is lackluster and has three hospitals to serve its population. The local dog population—mainly strays belonging to children—is infected with rabies, and in 1987, 500 dogs were vaccinated for the virus.

== Transportation ==
Pikine has three roads, which often get congested. Its primary forms of transportation are buses and car rapides.

== Culture ==
The people of Pikine are known by the demonym 'Pikinois'.

Pikine is home to football club AS Pikine, who play at Stade Al Djigo in Pikine.

The national stadium for Senegalese wrestling is located in Pikine, and seats 20,000.

Africulturban, a cultural center, is located in Pikine. It was founded by rapper Matador.

== Notable people ==
- Papa Malick Ba (born 1980), footballer
- Mouhamed Barro (born 1995), basketball player
- Gee Bayss (born 1970), DJ
- Pape Abou Cissé (born 1995), footballer
- Fallou Diagne (born 1989), footballer
- Mbaye Diagne (1958–1994), military officer
- Papé Diakité (born 1992), footballer
- Pape Moussa Diakhatè (born 1989), footballer
- Moussa Diallo (born 1990), footballer
- Aïssatou Diamanka-Besland (born 1972), writer
- Doudou Diaw (born 1975), footballer
- Bamba Dieng (born 2000), footballer
- Cheikhou Dieng (born 1993), footballer
- Oumar Diouck (born 1994), footballer
- Amara Diouf (born 2008), footballer
- Pape Mour Faye (born 1987), basketball playee
- Ibrahima Gueye (born 1978), footballer
- Moussa Khoume Gueye (born 1985), footballer
- Abdou Guirassy (born 1989), footballer
- Mamadou Kassé Hann (born 1986), hurdler
- Amadou Hott (born 1972), economist and investment banker
- Alioune Kébé (born 1984), footballer
- Aboubakary Koïta (born 1998), footballer
- Andreas Manga (born 1980), footballer
- Matador, rapper
- Pathé Mboup (born 2003), footballer
- Amath Ndiaye (born 1996), footballer
- Mamy Ndiaye (born 1986), footballer
- Momar Ndoye (born 1992), footballer
- Abdoulaye Niang (born 1983), footballer
- Joseph Niouky (born 1986), footballer
- Christian Sagna (born 1982), footballer
- Safietou Sagna (born 1994), footballer
- Kor Sarr (1975–2019), footballer and manager
- Mamadou Seck (born 1947), politician
- Thione Seck (1955–2021), singer-songwriter
- Talla Sylla (born 1966), politician
- Émile Thiakane (born 1991), footballer
- Zourdine Thior (born 1997), footballer
- Zargo Touré (born 1989), footballer
