= Alioune Kébé =

Senegalese footballer (born 1984)

Personal information
- Full name: Alioune Badara Kébé
- Date of birth: 24 November 1984 (age 41)
- Place of birth: Pikine, Senegal
- Height: 1.80 m (5 ft 11 in)
- Position: Striker

Senior career*
Years	Team	Apps	(Gls)
2003–2004	Entente SSG	7	(0)
2004–2006	Le Mans UC72	7	(0)
2005–2006	→ Tours FC (loan)	15	(2)
2006–2007	R.E. Mouscron	19	(1)
2008	FC Gueugnon	8	(2)
2008–2009	Paris FC	16	(4)
2009–2011	AC Horsens	12	(7)
- * Club domestic league appearances and goals as of 21 April 2011

Alioune Kébé (born 24 November 1984) is a former Senegalese footballer who played as a striker.

Kebe is since August 2008 owner of the senegalese club Mayacine Foot Centre.
