= Thiaroye =

- Town
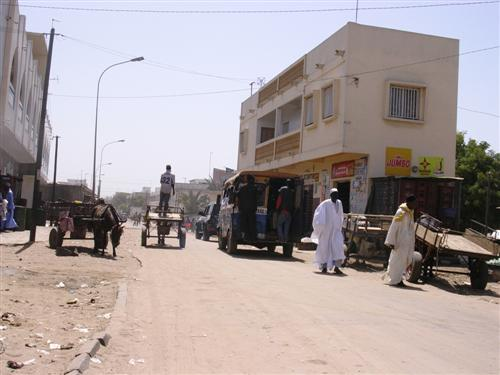
- Street scene in Thiaroye (2006)

- Location within Senegal
- Coordinates: 14°44′N 17°21′W
- Country: Senegal
- Region: Dakar Region
- Department: Pikine
- Elevation: 9 m (30 ft)
- Time zone: UTC+0 (GMT)

Thiaroye (or Tiaroye) is the name of a historic town in Sénégal, situated in the suburbs of Dakar, on the southeast coast of the Cap-Vert peninsula, between Pikine and Rufisque.

Since the administrative reform in 1996, Thiaroye has been divided into independent communes, Thiaroye-Gare, Thiaroye-sur-Mer and Thiaroye-Kao (or Djiddah Thiaroye Kao), with Guinaw-Rail Nord, Guinaw-Rail Sud (both to the west), and Tivaouane-Diacksao (to the east) split off and separating Thiaroye-sur-Mer from the other two inland communes.

== History ==
The village of Thiaroye was founded sometime around 1800, and as the city of Dakar, created by the French, expanded in the 20th century, Thiaroye was slowly merged into the larger city.

Thiaroye is most known for, and its name has become emblematic of, a single incident in 1944: the Thiaroye Massacre by French forces. On 1 December 1944, at the barracks of Thiaroye, African soldiers clashed with the French state. The uprising involved nearly 1280 African ex-POWs in the first contingent to be repatriated from Europe in 1944. The event was defined as "mutinous" because the men were partially armed, uniformed and under military discipline. The cause of the soldiers' protest was the failure of the French authorities to provide them with back-pay and demobilization premiums. The event in Thiaroye sent shockwaves throughout French West Africa. The uprising reflected a change in attitude towards France. The African ex-POWs had acquired a heightened consciousness of themselves as Africans united by their shared experience in suffering.

== Administration and politics ==
Thiaroye is the seat of Thiaroye Arrondissement in the Pikine Department (région de Dakar). The three communes are governed as a single entity, but retain some administrative independence.

== Geography ==
Thiaroye-Gare, closest to Dakar, is bordered by Pikine (a city of almost one million people), Nimzat, Yeumbeul, Thiaroye Kao, Diaksaw and Darou Rahmane. Thiaroye-sur-Mer is bordered by Bel-Air, Hann-Montagne, Pikine, Guinaw-Rails, Tivaouane, Diammagueun, Mbaw Gou Ndaw and Gorée. Thiaroye-Kao, border Yeumbeul, Boun and Darou Rahmane.

== Population ==
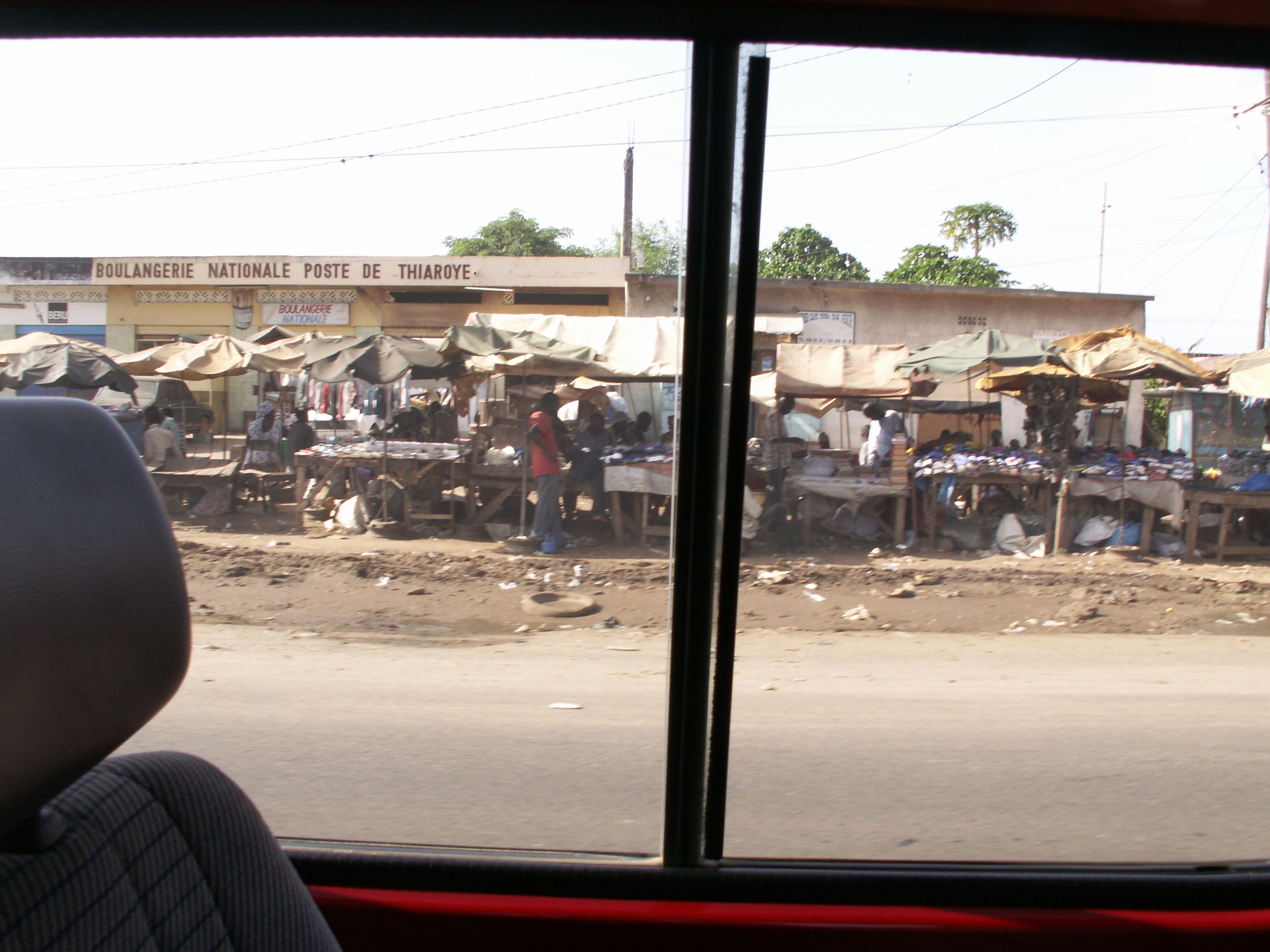
Traders set up along the autoroute in Thiaroye (2005).

As of 2002 the population of Thiaroye-Gare has grown to 21,873, Thiaroye-sur-Mer to 36,602, and that of Thiaroye-Kao to 90,586.

As of 2007 official estimates put the population of the three communes at 24,867, 41,612 and 102,985.

== Economic activity ==
Thiaroye continues to be integrated economically into Dakar, with much of the population commuting to the city center for work.

Thiaroye-Gare is named for the large train station on the line leading to Dakar, and continues to be a major transport center. Goods and people travelling to and from Dakar must pass here, and it is one of the reasons neighboring Pikine was founded as a relocation camp in 1952.

Small scale industry, artisanal trades and commerce make up much of the rest of the economy, though unemployment remains high, as in other outer suburbs, which see regular immigration from rural areas.

=== Pollution ===
One outgrowth of small scale industry in Thiaroye has been a high rate of pollution and pollution-related diseases. One recent form of income, the salvaging of automobile batteries for products including lead, has created a highly publicised wave of childhood illnesses. In the past, local blacksmiths of the Thiaroye Sur Mer area had salvaged lead from car batteries to fashion into net weights for the nearby fishing industry. In the mid-2000s, as the world price of lead increased, purchasing agents from India offered large payments for lead, leading locals to sift tailings from smithies' and breakers' yards for lead pellets, usually by hand. Lead poisoning of children born to workers, or those who were exposed to the lead dust created by sifting, climbed. As of the end of 2008, this pollution has been blamed for at least 18 deaths and hundreds of poisoning related illnesses, along with uncounted deaths of animals and human miscarriages. A much publicised government cleanup campaign has, according to the World Health Organization, been ineffective, and plans are under study to move entire neighbourhoods in the town.

=== Market ===
Thiaroye-Gare market is situated along the border with Pikine near the Thiaroye station, and is the largest produce market in the Dakar region, fed by suppliers from Nyayes, Cap-Vert, Casamance, and Keur Massar. The train line (the Petit train bleu) from Dakar stops at the very center of the market, making it easy for city residents to shop there, and avoiding the higher city prices.

Around the produce market have grown markets for general manufactures, one of the largest lumber markets in Dakar, and wholesale companies supplying markets in city center. There are over 4500 formal traders, almost that many street sellers and a thousand or more wholesale shops surrounding the market. The lumber market has also drawn artisanal woodcarvers and an industry selling wood for barbeque cooking at festivals and family celebrations.

=== Institutions ===
Thiaroye is also the home of the Centre de recherches océanographiques de Dakar-Thiaroye (CRODT), and a large mental hospital.

== Notable people ==
- Karfa Diallo (born 1971), activist and writer, founder of the Mémoires & Partages association.
- Ismaïla N'Diaye (born 1988), professional footballer who was born here.

== See also ==
- Thiaroye Massacre
- Dakar
- Pikine
