= Daara J =

Senegalese rap duo

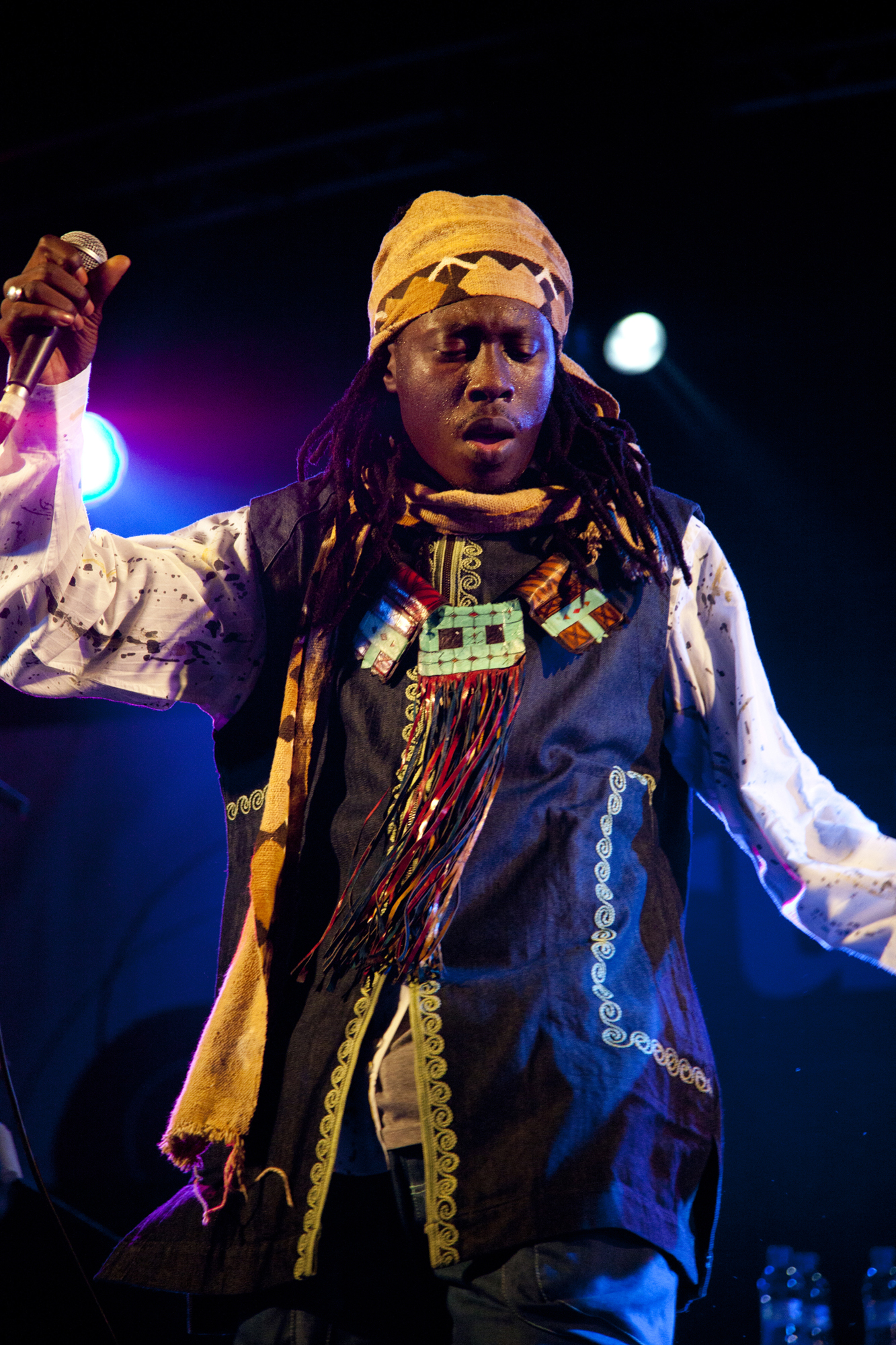
- Daara J performing in 2010

Background information
- Origin: Senegal
- Genres: African hip hop
- Years active: 1997–present
- Label: Wrasse
- Members: Faada Freddy; N'Dongo D
- Past members: Lord Alajiiman

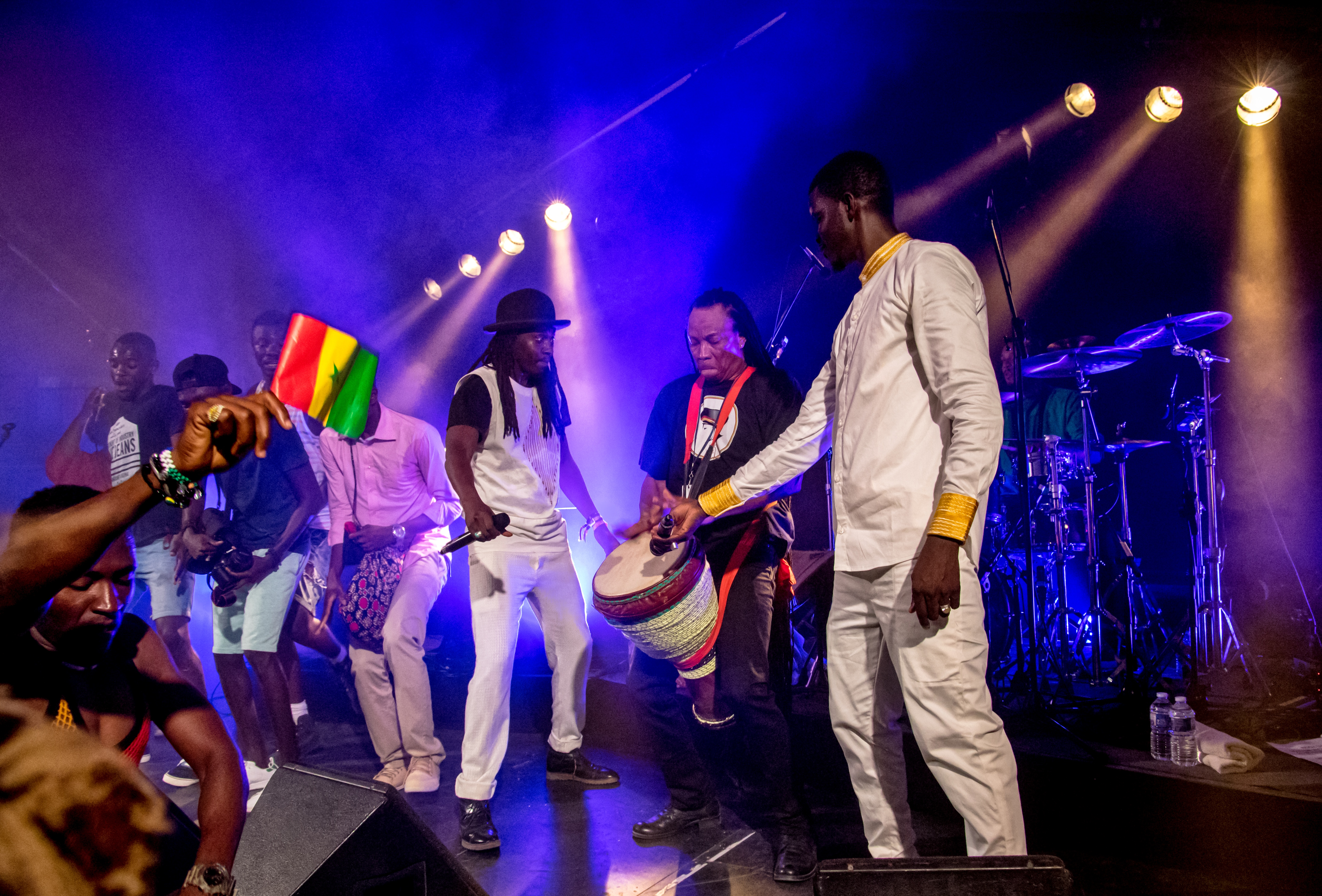
Daara J at the Zelt-Musik-Festival 2018 in Freiburg, Germany

Daara J (pronounced [d̺aːɾɐ ɟi], which means "the school" in Wolof) are a Senegalese rap duo that consists of N'Dongo D and Faada Freddy. Their music takes influence from hip hop, Afro-Cuban rhythms, and reggae and is performed in English, French, Spanish, and Wolof.

Daara J was formed in 1997 and quickly became popular in Senegal from the release of their first cassette album, Daara J. They followed in 1999 with a more politically themed recording, Xalima, which integrated numerous musical ideas and instruments from Senegal and other African countries. 2003's Boomerang was critically acclaimed and furthered the combination of various musical and lyrical influences of the previous two recordings. Activism has also been an important aspect of the group's philosophy since it was founded.

== Formation ==
Daara J, formed in 1994, was originally a trio that consisted of Faada Freddy, N'Dongo D and Lord Alajiiman. Lord Alajiiman performed and toured throughout the world with the group until 2008 when the group split. Since then, Alajiman evolves in a solo career while contributing to the development of the music sector in Senegal. Daara J was formed when all of its members were in high school, where they were studying accounting. The rappers were influenced by American hip hop artists such as Grandmaster Flash and the Furious Five and Afrika Bambaataa but also listened to their parents' music, which included artists such as Sly and the Family Stone and Aretha Franklin, and musical styles which included Cuban music. Faada Freddy cites the group's major inspiration as Das EFX. Originally, the members took instrumentals of hip hop tracks from the United States and France to rap over. Later they purchased a drum machine, but even with this equipment, a member of the group would have to imitate the other instruments in the song with his voice. Positive Black Soul, another Senegalese rap group, encouraged Daara J to record and perform.

== Daara J and Xalima ==
Daara J and Xalima were both released on the label Déclic. The group's 1998 eponymous debut album was produced by the reggae musician Mad Professor and was successful locally, selling 15,000 copies. Their next album was released in 1999 and titled Xalima (English: Quill and Ink). The album was politically themed and included guest performances from other Senegalese artists playing instruments such as the kora and balafon.

== Boomerang ==
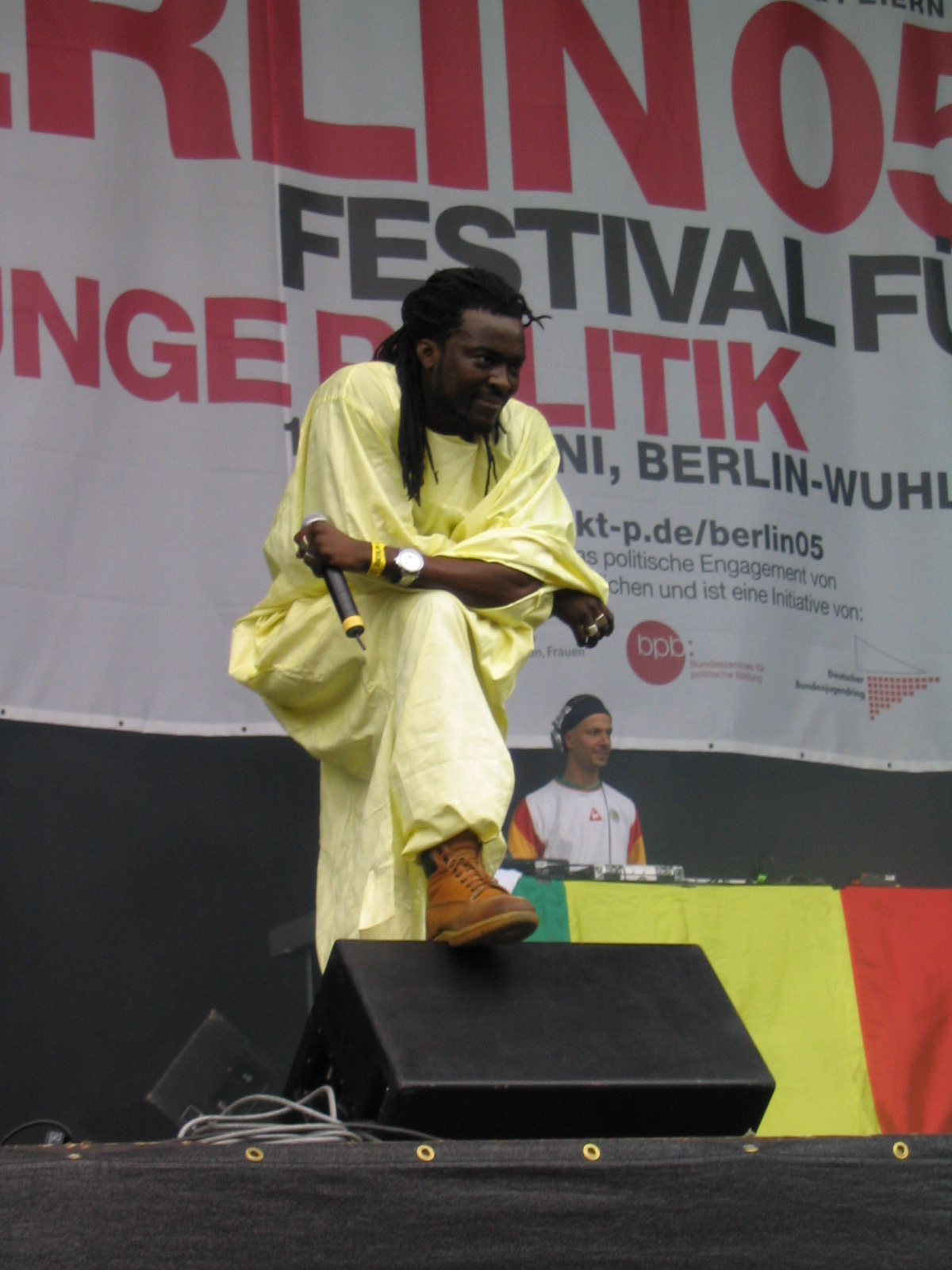
Aladji Man of Daara J performs in Berlin, 2005

The group moved to Wrasse Records to release Boomerang in 2003. It featured performances by guests including Rokia Traoré. The album's title is based on the idea that hip hop music was born in Africa, spread around the world, then returned to the continent. Daara J note similarities between rap and tassou—a traditional African verbal performance technique used to discuss the social and political environment, daily life, and future aspirations. They believe it traveled from Africa by way of the United States slave trade. A year after the release of the album, Daara J won the Best African Act award from BBC Radio 3.

The album itself was described as "one of the hip hop albums of the century" by the British newspaper The Observer and was successful on European music charts. Other reviews have been positive; Matthew Pollesel of Splendid Magazine praised the album for its lyrical content: "...as Daara J show throughout Boomerang, it's possible to get the meaning of those words just by listening to the things that surround them—the intensity of the rappers' delivery, the quality of the beats, and how well all those other factors coalesce around the words. And on that score, Daara J's message comes through loud and clear." However, Katharina Lobeck of BBC Music noted that one of the tracks, the R&B-influenced "Hip Hop Civilization", is "too generically soppy for even the most hardened R&B fans", but went on to say that the album is "a successful sonic adventure which thrives on its defiance of the margins of established sales categories".

The group has made appearances at various WOMAD festivals around the world, the Live 8 concert in Eden Project, and Africa Calling. In 2017 they were on stage at the Abi Reggae festival in Abidjan, Côte d'Ivoire. Daara J has also performed with other hip hop artists and groups including Public Enemy, Wyclef Jean, and Mos Def.

== Activism ==
Like many other African hip hop groups including Positive Black Soul, Daara J takes an activist stance. Faada Freddy states: "We tell of peace and how we can live together because there are lots of conflicts going on nowadays. We're here on behalf of the Africans to remind everybody that it shouldn't be like that. There's always a solution. Rather than fussing and fighting we'd better learn to live in peace and live together, because that's the only way to survive." The group is especially focused on educating the world about Africa. Faada Freddy has also stressed the importance of understanding life on the continent: "Nowadays people are tending to show the negative part of Africa but Africa is not only about AIDS, heartache, corruption and all that even though it exists just like everywhere else. But Africa has a lot to provide." In the Senegalese election of 2000, Daara J were involved in editing speeches for political leaders and the promotion of that year's campaign against corruption.

== Discography ==
=== Albums ===
- 1998: Daara J
- 1999: Xalima
- 2003: Boomerang
- 2010: School Of Life
- 2016: Foundation
- 2020: Yaamatele

== Faada Freddy solo discography ==
=== Albums ===
| Year | Album | Peak positions |
| Year | Album | FR |
|---|---|---|
| 2015 | Gospel Journey | 22 |

=== EPs ===
| Year | Album | Peak positions |
| Year | Album | FR |
|---|---|---|
| 2015 | Untitled EP | 109 |

=== Singles ===
| Year | Single | Peak positions | Album |
| Year | Single | FR | Album |
|---|---|---|---|
| 2015 | "Reality Cuts Me Like a Knife" | 129 | Gospel Journey |
| 2015 | "We Sing in Time" | 168 | Gospel Journey |
