= Waga Hip Hop Festival =

Annual music festival in Ouagadougou, Burkina Faso

Waga Hip Hop is one of the major international hip hop festivals taking place in West Africa. Each year, around early and mid-October, Ouagadougou (Burkina Faso) thus welcomes international artists and media to attend this festival of urban cultures.

== Waga Hip Hop and its framing ==
Created in 2000, Waga Hip Hop is the flagship event of the association Umane Culture. This association stands out as an active cultural structure, which develops multidisciplinary projects, in music, theatre, dance and tales, created in 1997 by Ali Diallo (member of the Export Bureau of African Music, BEMA). The latest realisation of Umane Culture was the creation, in November 2008, of the first Burkinabé music market, Saga Musik.

At first, Waga Hip Hop was organised with local hip hop artists solely at a time when Hip Hop was booming in Burkina Faso (2001–2003) mainly thanks to the arrival of an initial studio (Abazon) whose arranger was specialised in hip hop productions (Smockey). However, very quickly, Waga Hip Hop reached an international scale, notably in 2002, with the support of international cultural organisations. Since then, and for each of its editions, Waga Hip Hop has welcomed artists coming from throughout the continent. With respect, it stands as one of the most visible festivals dedicated to the urban cultures in the West African region. Unsurprisingly, Waga Hip Hop, as a yearly event, has now raised international consideration.

== Waga Hip Hop and its diverse programming ==
Each year, Waga Hip Hop aims at being as largely as possible representative of all the urban cultures. As such, Waga Hip Hop not only welcomes in its organisation showcases and performances of hip hop artists but also those of other urban artists such as the now well-known Victor Démé who was discovered through a performance he gave during the festival. Besides, Waga Hip Hop regularly holds artistic residencies dedicated to the various disciplines of urban cultures such as hip hop dance, beatbox and other vocal urban music. Its most famous production is “Waka Tibio”, which came out of the artistic residencies held during the 2008 and 2009 editions, and welcomed the joint performances of Fredy Massamba (DRC), King Ayisoba (Ghana), Awa Sissao (Burkina Faso) and DJ Gee Bayss (Senegal).

Besides, with the desire to expand its contribution to the whole country, Waga Hip Hop holds events in the capital city, i.e. Ouagadougou as well as throughout the country, in the different regional cities (Ouahigouya, Fada N’Gourma, Bobo Dioulasso, Pô, Koudougou). Not only a space of creation and diffusion, Waga Hip Hop also stands as an important sphere of training and formation. Indeed, and in order to support the development of the local cultural community, the festival yearly organises workshops dedicated to the local cultural operators as well as to the artists.

The principal partners of Waga Hip Hop are the Francophonia International Organisation (OIF), Africalia (Belgium), Culture France but also Staycalm!, a Paris-based artistic collective which has been supporting Waga Hip Hop since its early years. Staycalm! has now become well known for its multimedia production on West African Hip Hop, “Fangafrika”.

== See also ==
- List of hip hop music festivals
- Hip hop culture

Hip Hop artists from Burkina Faso (Note: This list does not pretend to be exhaustive. The artists or groups listed here are among those who considerably marked the movement (and who have an existing online visibility (for reference). Other groups and artists that worth being quoted are Busta Gaeenga, Basic Soul (1st rapper to release a hip hop production in 1997), Dudn’J (ex-member of Clepto Gang), Golgo13, La Censure (1st group to release a collective hip hop production in 2003), Leekma, KDR, Poetes Fyziks, and Wemteng Clan.)	Urban artists from Burkina Faso (Note: This list does not pretend to be exhaustive. The artists or groups listed here are among the most visible of the Burkinabé musical scene and who have an existing online visibility (for reference). Other groups and artists that worth being quoted are Baba Commandant and the Afromandingo Band, Dumba Kultur, Jacob Kuilibila, Sam’s K le Jah, Youmali and Zougnazagmda.)	Urban Information in Burkina Faso
Afrik’slam; Art Melody; Deris (graffeur); Gold (DJ); Duny Yaam; El Primo; Faso Kombat; Konkret53; Wed Hyack; OBC; Obscur Jaffar; Smockey; Wenlamita Kouka; Yeleen	Alif Naaba; Awa Sissao; Baliku Roots; Bil Aka Kora; Diarra Brothers; Floby; Victor Deme	Planet Culture (cultural journalist association); FasoRap (hip hop webzine); BurkinaRap (hip hop webzine)
