= Positive Black Soul =

Senegalese hip-hop group

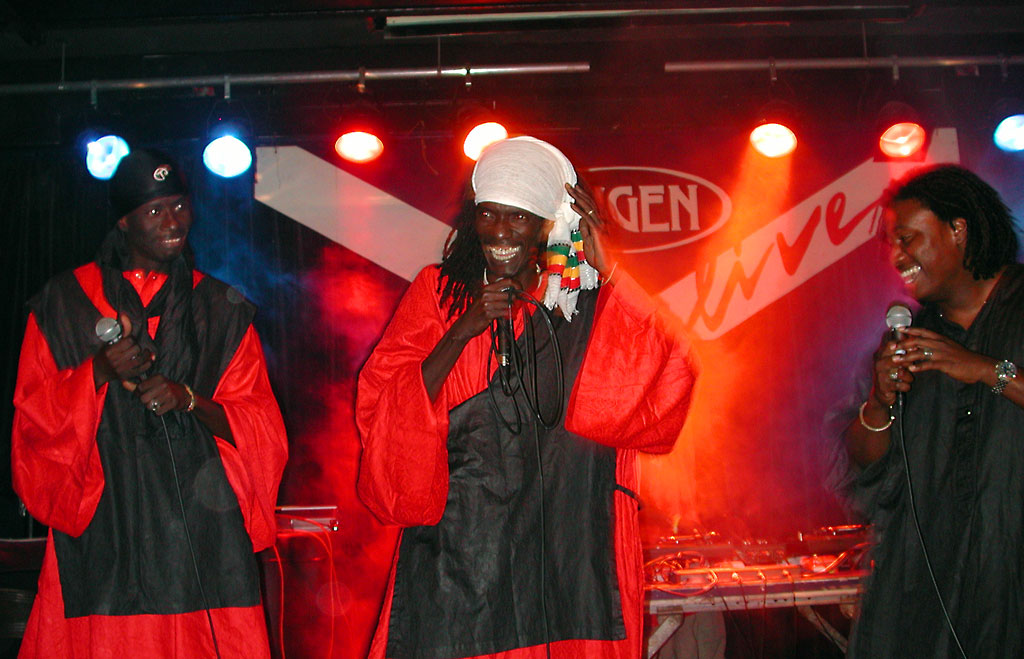
- Positive Black Soul performing in Vienna, Austria (2003)

Background information
- Also known as: PBS
- Origin: Dakar, Senegal
- Genres: Senegalese hip hop
- Years active: 1989–present
- Members: Didier Awadi (DJ Awadi); Amadou Barry (Doug E. Tee or Duggy-Tee)

Positive Black Soul (also known as PBS) is a hip-hop group based in Dakar, Senegal, one of the first such collectives in the country. Founded in 1989, the group is composed of Didier Sourou Awadi (alias DJ Awadi) and Amadou Barry (alias Doug E. Tee or Duggy-Tee), both of whom had previously been in other hip hop groups. They perform in the English, French, and Wolof languages and use traditional Senegalese instruments as part of their songs. Political and social activism have played important roles in the group since it was founded.

== History ==
The two members of Positive Black Soul were born in the city of Dakar, Senegal. As teenagers, Awadi and Barry were involved in the Dakar hip hop scene—Awadi leading his own group, Didier Awadi's Syndicate, a breakdancer as well as a rapper; and Barry performing with the King MCs. Originally Awadi and Barry were rivals, competing with each other in performances and coming from separate neighborhoods of Dakar. During a birthday party held by Awadi to which Barry was invited, however, the two performed together and realized their similarities, founding Positive Black Soul very soon after. Activism and politics are central parts of the group's philosophy—its shortened name (PBS) was a play on the Parti Démocratique Sénégalais initialism "PDS".

In 1992, the group performed at a music festival held by the Dakar French Cultural Center, where the French rapper MC Solaar heard their performance and invited the group to open for him when he debuted in Dakar in October of that year. The rapper was impressed with Positive Black Soul, inviting them to continue performing with him in France. Two years later the group put out its first release, a cassette entitled Boul Falé. The album was followed by more touring in France, as well as in England and Switzerland. In the same year, the Senegalese musician Baaba Maal offered PBS the opportunity to be on his album Firin' in Fouta. Maal was signed to Mango Records and because of this recording with him, Positive Black Soul were signed as well. They released their album debut Salaam on Mango Records. After achieving success in Senegal and some abroad, the group continued touring, including 130 performances in 1997. They also began organizing concerts in Dakar and promoting new groups including Daara J and Pee Froiss.

Positive Black Soul's first international release, New York Paris-Dakar, had been previously released as a cassette in Senegal. However it was only in 1997, six years after its initial appearance, that it was sold outside of the country. The American rapper KRS-One, one of the group's collaborators on the album, shared a similar philosophy and interest in Pan-Africanism with Awadi and Barry.

In 2002, the group appeared on the Red Hot Organization's tribute album to Fela Kuti, Red Hot and Riot. They contributed to a track titled "No Agreement" alongside Res, Tony Allen, Ray Lema, Baaba Maal, and Archie Shepp.

Since about 2002, the group's members have been pursuing solo projects. On August 14, 2009, PBS performed in Dakar for their 20th anniversary, effectively ending speculations about whether they had disbanded. Guests at the concert included powerful Senegalese music stars such as Youssou Ndour and Ismaël Lô.

== Activism ==
Positive Black Soul has promoted political activity and activism in other areas. The group urged Senegalese people to participate in the country's government and vote in elections. PBS also decries images of Africa in the media, which they view as one-sided. They state: "We want to show the positivity in the black soul. That's our fight. Africa is not only a land of suffering, misery, war and disease. We're proud to live there and we are not suffering." They view their chosen medium of rap as an accessible way to talk about issues such as corruption and politics. AIDS has also been featured in their music: one song, "Écoute Fils" ("Listen Son"), is written about the disease and cautions listeners about its dangers.

== Discography ==
- Boul Falé (1994)
- Salaam (1995)
- Daw Thiow (1996)
- Wakh Feign (1996)
- New York-Paris-Dakar (1997)
- Revolution (2000)
- Run Cool (2001)
