= Pee Froiss =

Hip Hop Group

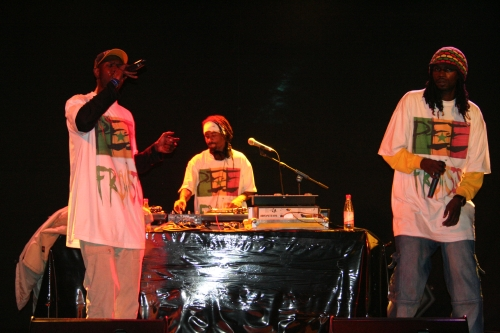
- Pee Froiss at a performance in Germany

Background information
- Origin: Dakar, Senegal
- Genre: African hip hop
- Years active: 1990s–present
- Members: Xuman (Makhtar Fall); Daddy Bibson (Cheikh Coly); Sistah Joyce; Koc 6 (Babacar Diagne); DJ Gee Bayss (Georges Martin Lopis)
- Past members: Souley Ba

Pee Froiss is a hip hop group formed in Dakar, Senegal in 1993. It was originally a dance group which refocused on rap. Early on, Pee Froiss received mentorship from the Senegalese rap luminaries Positive Black Soul, which produced their first album Wala Wala Bok? in 1996. The band's music is rapped in Wolof, French, and English and features traditional Senegalese instruments such as the kora as part of its instrumentation. Pee Froiss was one of the first rap groups to include a female performer in their lineup, Sistah Joyce. The group created all of their own music videos with very sparse resources, the first of which was released with their first album. Wala Wala Bok? is considered a classic of Senegalese hip hop. Alongside, Positive Black Soul and Daara J, Pee Froiss emerged as trailblazers in Senegalese hip hop, galvanizing a generation by intertwining the genre with themes of political resistance and social activism.

Though the group released successful albums on cassette solely in Senegal and appeared on several European compilations, the first release to be sold internationally was their album Konkérants in 2003.

== Discography ==
- Wala Wala Bok (1996)
- Affaire Bou Graw (1997)
- Ah Simm (1999)
- F.R.O.I.S.S (2001)
- Konkérants (2003)
