= Brothers Keepers =

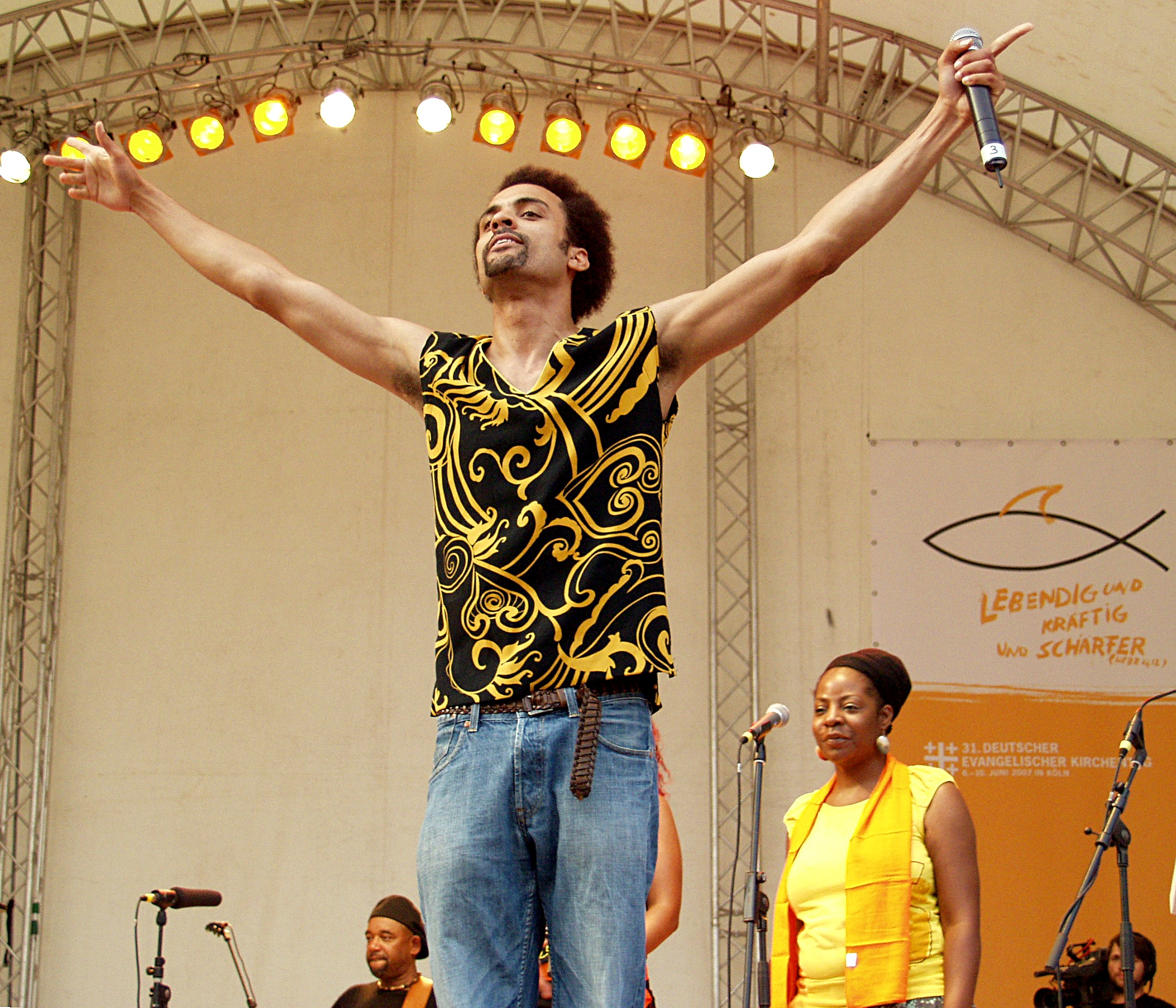

Brothers Keepers is a German-based transnational anti-racism project, bringing together hip hop, reggae and soul musicians, headed primarily by Afro-Germans. Their debut single, "Adriano-Letzte Warnung", was written in response to the murder of Alberto Adriano by Neo-Nazis. It remains their most popular release, with more than 6 million views on YouTube.

== History ==
The idea for the project took root when a German of Mozambiquan origin, named Alberto Adriano, was brutally killed by neo-Nazis in Dessau in 2000. A group of musicians decided to organize and fight back.

The following quote is about Adriano's death and its effect.

Original:

Als Alberto Adriano an Pfingsten 2000 von Neonazis in Dessau ermordet wird, hinterlässt er eine Ehefrau und drei Kinder – eine Familie, die nun nicht nur lernen muss, ohne ihren Vater und Mann zu leben, sondern zugleich verstehen muss, dass er starb, weil er ein Schwarzer war.

English:

Alberto Adriano, killed on Pentecost 2000 by neo-Nazis in Dessau, is survived by a wife and three children – a family that not only must learn to live without a father and husband, but also has to understand that he died because he was black.

Brothers Keepers has local groups active in information campaigns, presenting teach-ins at schools etc. However the project primarily gained prominence in Germany through the collaborative album, Lightkultur. The title is a pun on conservative politician Günther Beckstein’s term "deutsche Leitkultur" ("German leading culture"), demanding that foreigners subject themselves to the supposed standards of German culture. The album features German musicians such as Torch, Samy Deluxe, Afrob, Denyo from the Beginner and D-Flame. The proceeds of this album went to charity.

== Politicization/Critique ==
Brothers Keepers faced much criticism and disapproval despite being one of the first groups of Afro-German hip-hop artists that broke into the mainstream while addressing the struggles behind the Afro-German racial identity. On the one hand, the rappers are denounced for being "too German." As described by Fatima El-Tayeb, "Black Germans’ attempt to make their country their home by creating a space for themselves on its imaginary map – a step which, if successful, would mean a dramatic reconfiguration of ‘Germanness’ – is held against them by exactly those white Germans who most decry the nation's anachronistic and exclusionary concept of identity." On the other hand, they are also criticized, mostly by white German liberals, for being too Black, racially exclusive, and anti-multicultural. They also received charges for perpetuating male dominance and masculinity that undermines the notable role that women and feminism asserted during the early stages of the Hip Hop movement. The main concern is that while they have made significant contributions to the protest against racial divides and essentialization for the Afro-German community in large, they might have done so in a way that fails to subvert gender stereotypes and is quite often offensive, if not hostile, towards women.

=== Gender dynamics ===
Brothers Keepers presented themselves and delivered their message in traditionally masculine ways. Their presentation was heavily influenced by the Black masculinity of mainstream American Hip-Hop, but maintained a distinctly Afro-German identity and spoke to Afro-German issues. Especially in lyrics and videos that were explicitly against Nazism and anti-Blackness in Germany, they formed a confrontational masculine collectivity. This was reaffirmed by their exclusion of women from their music and videos, an absence which they claimed was due to female performers being pregnant or on maternity leave. Some of the female performers in question, Sisters Keepers, contrasted with that masculinity with a rhetoric of peace and coalition-building rather than direct confrontation. In fact, in the music video for Sisters Keepers's "Liebe und Verstand," members of Brothers Keepers make visual and auditory cameos, giving the song a gendered authenticity. Although Brothers Keepers sought to reaffirm Afro-German identity with a masculinist perspective, the formation of the Afro-German identity was done largely by Afro-German women.

Black Lesbian feminist theorist and poet Audre Lorde can be identified as instrumental in facilitating contemporary articulations of Black Germanness. In 1984, Lorde visited Berlin and met with Black German women (such as Maya Ayim, Katharina Oguntoye, and Ika Hügel-Marshall) and coined the term "Afro-German". Following the consolidation of terminology, a movement emerged led by the publication of Farbe bekennen (translated as Showing Our Colors: Afro-German Women Speak Out). Then, several organizations coalesced to critique the racism of the German feminist movement, including Initiative Schwarze Deutsche" (ISD), and "Afro-deutsche Frauen" (ADEFRA). These organizations' early activities involved publishing magazines and organizing the first Black History Month celebrations in Berlin. They were foundational for community building along gendered and racialized lines in Germany and elsewhere, and they were pioneered by Afro-German women.

As hip-hop became means of forwarding Afro-German activism, Brother Keepers’ select historical consciousness demonstrates how "the strong presence of women – articulate, feminist, often lesbian – in the first decades of the Afro-German struggle has been hard for young male MCs to stomach, given that they generally model themselves after images of black masculinity that are often deeply sexist and homophobic". In other words, "By relegating female performers to the margins... Brothers Keepers runs counter to the strong presence of women and feminism in the history of Afro-German political organizing". Brother Keepers’ female counterpart, Sisters Keepers, emerged as an ostensible afterthought, and in their collaboration, Sisters Keepers were relinquished to the background as apolitical and demure sidekicks. This representation is a far cry from the true role Afro-German women have played in activism. Sisters Keepers later diverged from Brother Keepers, renaming themselves to "Sisters" and releasing the more radical record Gender Riots in 2008.

== Song lyrics ==
The lyrics on the album are influenced by Black Power rhetoric and are militantly anti-Nazi, proposing solutions to racism ranging from education to violence. The militancy is especially well illustrated in the German Top 10 hit "Adriano", a seven-minute tour de force produced by DJ Desue, featuring the crème of German rap. Its video shows a procession of rappers, marching as a united front and the chorus, sung by South African-descended R&B star Xavier Naidoo, goes thus:

Original:

Dies' ist so 'was wie eine letzte Warnung, / Denn unser Rückschlag ist längst in Planung. / Wir fall’n darein, wo ihr auffallt, / Wir bieten eurer braunen Scheiße endlich Aufhalt. / Denn was ihr sucht, ist das Ende. / Und was wir reichen sind geballte Fäuste und keine Hände. / Euer Niedergang für immer! / Und was wir hören denn ist euer Weinen und euer Gewimmer.

English:

"This is something like a final warning, / As we have been planning our counterstrike for a long time. / We intervene where you emerge, / At last, we offer resistance to your brown shit. / ‘Cause what you want is the end. / And what we offer are clenched fists and not our hands. / Your downfall forever! / And what we’ll hear is your crying and your whimpering."

or

Ich sage K, sage Z, sage Nazis rein / Ich will nicht labern, denn ich kenn mein Vaterland / Macht es mich krank wie Masern, dann verspür ich Tatendrang / Ich fühle mich eingeengt und will statt Prominenz / Und statt großer Fans, Nazis die wie Poster hängen.

"I say K, I say Z, I say Nazis inside / I don't wanna talk 'cause I know my country / Does it make me sick like measles, then I wanna act / Then I feel constricted and want instead of prominence / and lots of fans, Nazis who hang like posters."

The project is not limited to Germany. It focuses on manifestations of the African diaspora throughout the world and is supported by international artists such as Jamaican reggae musician Ziggy Marley and Senegalese mbalax musician Youssou N'Dour. There is a UK Brothers Keepers, which, while lacking the organizational superstructure of its German counterpart, contributed a track to Lightkultur.

There is also a female version of this Movement/Band called the Sisters Keepers consisting of Nadja Benaissa, Ayọ, Kaye, Nicole Hadfield (Groove Guerrilla), and Tamika, along with Tesiree, Lisa, Mamadee, Pat and Meli (Skills en Masse, Ischen Impossible) with Onejiru (Pielina Schindler).

== Discography ==
=== Albums ===
Year	Title	Chart Positions		
Year	Title	GER	AUT	SWI
2001	Lightkultur (with the Sisters Keepers)			
2005	Am I My Brother's Keeper?			

=== Singles ===
Year	Title	Chart Positions			Album
Year	Title	GER	AUT	SWI	Album
2001	"Adriano - Letzte Warnung"				
2005	"Bereit"			"Afrobob"	
2005	"Will We Ever know?"				

== Performers ==
A list is available on the website.

- Adé Bantu
- Afrob
- Chima
- Denyo
- D-Flame
- Don Abi
- Ebony Prince, Germ
- Eased of Seeed
- Gentleman
- Harry Belafonte
- Joachim Deutschland
- Jah Meek
- Nosliw
- Ono Ngcala
- Patrice Bart-Williams
- Such A Surge
- Sékou
- Samy Deluxe
- Toni L
- Torch
- Tyron Ricketts
- UB40
- Xavier Naidoo
- Youssou N’Dour
- Ziggy Marley
