= Beautiful Soul =

Beautiful Soul may refer to:

- Beautiful Soul (Mamadee album), 2013, or the title track
- Beautiful Soul (Jesse McCartney album), 2004
  - "Beautiful Soul" (song), Jesse McCartney 2004
- Beautiful Soul (Cynthia Layne album), 2007, or the title track
- Beautiful Soul: The ABC Dunhill Collection, a 2001 compilation album by Dusty Springfield, featuring tracks from Longing
- "Beautiful Soul", a song by Kobo Town featuring Kellylee Evans on Independence (2003)
- Beautiful Soul, Nigerian film directed by Tchidi Chikere, Africa Movie Academy Award for Best Screenplay 2008

== See also ==
- A Beautiful Soul (disambiguation)
