= Journey to Jah =

Studio album by Gentleman
- Released: March 25, 2002
- Genre: Reggae
- Length: 55:26
- Label: Sony BMG
- Producer: Stephan Schulmeister

Gentleman chronology
Trodin On (1999)	Journey to Jah (2002)	Confidence (2004)

Journey to Jah is the second studio album by German Reggae artist Gentleman, produced by Stephan Schulmeister.

== Critical reception ==
Professional ratings
Review scores
Source	Rating
laut.de	4/5 stars

Laut.de editor Martina Schmid felt that Journey to Jah "successfully combines chilled reggae sounds with energetic dancehall influences" while promoting messages of "peace, love, and unity." She described the record as "sophisticated reggae" with a "cohesive flow," and praised it for showcasing Gentleman's vocal talent without relying on sexist lyrics." She rated the album four stars out of five.

== Commercial performance ==
In 2004, Journey to Jah was certified Gold by the Bundesverband Musikindustrie (BVMI).

== Track listing ==
1. "Dem Gone" – 4:03
2. "Ina Different Time (feat. Jahmali & Daddy Rings)" – 3:51
3. "Runaway" – 3:41
4. "Man A Rise (feat. Bounty Killer)" – 3:32
5. "Love Chant" – 4:34
6. "See Dem Coming" – 3:52
7. "Man Of My Own (feat. Morgan Heritage)" – 3:52
8. "Leave Us Alone" – 3:27
9. "Long Face" – 3:55
10. "Younger Generation (feat. Luciano & Mikey General)" – 4:47
11. "Dangerzone (feat. Junior Kelly)" – 4:10
12. "Empress" – 4:10
13. "Fire Ago Bun Dem (feat. Capleton)" – 3:58
14. "Jah Ina Yuh Life" – 3:47
15. "Children Of Tomorrow (feat. Jack Radics)" – 4:44

== Charts ==
Weekly chart performance for Confidence
Chart (2004)	Peak position
Austrian Albums (Ö3 Austria)	19
German Albums (Offizielle Top 100)	14
Swiss Albums (Schweizer Hitparade)	21

== Certifications ==
Certifications for Journey to Jah
Region	Certification	Certified units/sales
Germany (BVMI)	Platinum	300,000^{^}
^{*} Sales figures based on certification alone.^{^} Shipments figures based on certification alone.
