= Schulmeister =

Schulmeister is a German surname meaning "schoolmaster". Notable people with the surname include:

- Jan Schulmeister, Czech footballer
- Karl Schulmeister, Austrian spy
- Otto Schulmeister, Austrian journalist
- Rolf Schulmeister, German educator
- Sergio Schulmeister, Argentine footballer
- Stephan Schulmeister, Austrian jurist and economist
- Vojtěch Schulmeister, Czech footballer
