= Sisters Keepers =

2000s music group

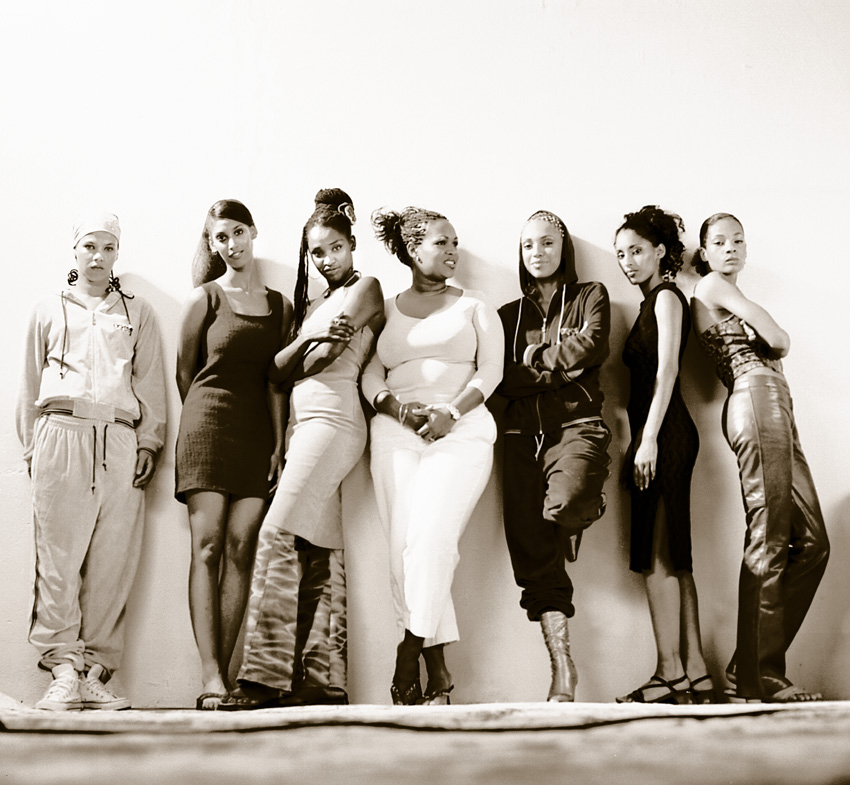
Sisters Keepers in 2001

Sisters Keepers were initially a subset of the band Brothers Keepers, formed in the autumn of 2001 in Germany, joined a compilation album Lightkultur (WEA) by the Brothers Keepers. Appealing against racism, famous female and mainly Afro-German singers joined with reggae, Soul music and Hip-Hop background.

== Initial members ==
Among others for the members of the original Sisters Keepers were Nadja Benaissa, Ayọ, Kaye, Nicole Hadfield (Groove Guerrilla), and Tamika, along with Tesiree, Lisa, Mamadee, Pat and Meli (Skills en Masse, Ischen Impossible) with Onejiru (Pielina Schindler). "Liebe Und Verstand" was their largest hit on chart in Germany, Switzerland and Austria between December 2001 to February 2002, as many African artists joined to form a musical statement. With two songs, both released on the album Lightkultur by Brothers Keepers (WEA), they took a stand against racism and violence.

== "Sisters eV" against racism and violence ==
Actually, the members held positions among loose circle of network of female singers, or sisters.

Starting in 2004, the "Sisters eV" functioned with emphasis on activities for gender equality as well as protest against violence and racism, and environmental issues that Onejiru and Mamadee took the initiative. Among the list of female singers they worked with, Ngosi Madubuko and Angela Ordu are from Siberian music, who were two of the supporters close to the group.

In 2005, Sisters Keepers was renamed to "Sisters", and acted independent from Brothers Keepers there on. The Sisters started with Onejiru, Mamadee, Meli, Namusoke, Tamika and Nicole Hadfield (Groove Guerilla) and Lisa Cash coming in and out, and they represented North Rhine-Westphalia at the Bundesvision Song Contest 2008 to claim he fourteenth place with "Unite". In September 2008, they toured Germany, produced by Matthias Arfmann (Turtle Bay Country Club.) The same year, the first album Gender Riot was released.

== Role models for girls and women ==
Since 2010, Onejiru, Meli and Nicole Hadfield have been the core of the group with Mamadee, Tamika and Namusoke extending the act, and altogether they were black German female singers involved and supporting social and educational causes at schools. With Plan to empower girls and young women, Sisters participated in the "Because I am a Girl". project, and have been the ambassadors for the campaign since 2010. It was extended in the summer of 2011, when they toured Brazil, Ghana, Togo, as well as cities in Germany for "Girls go for Goals". They celebrated the first inaugural United Nations International Day of the Girl with Plan International on October 11, 2012, when Onejiru, Melanie Wharton and Nicole Hadfield performed in New York City singing the song "Because I am a Girl". realizing UN World Girls Day is a campaign to have equal rights for girls and boys. During their visit to NYC, the Sisters performed at the B. B. King Blues Club in NY.

== Brothers Keepers and Sisters Keepers ==
It is evident that there is an absence of female musicians in most music videos by the Sisters' brother band, Brothers Keepers. Many saw this as an absence from Afro-German volk envisioned by the Brothers and as drawing attention to the constitutive female outside of this mode of racial unity. The Brothers success and overbearing presence in music videos authorizes this female version of Afro-Germaness, forcefully visually transforming to hegemonic codes of femininity. Within it, there is a strong desire to envisage collectivity beyond peoplehood and the simultaneous failure to do so in Afro-German pop music and diaspora discourse underlines the nagging pervasiveness of this category and pressing need for alternatives.

== Discography ==
- 2001 Single "Liebe und Verstand"
- 2001 "Sister" (included in the album Lightkultur by BK, WEA)
- 2008 Single and Album Gender Riots
- "Because I am a Girl" by Sisters for Plan International Campaign "Because I am a girl" (www.biaag.de)

== See also ==
- Because I Am a Girl (campaign)
- Convention on the Rights of the Child
