= Radio (Ky-Mani Marley album) =

Studio album by Ky-Mani Marley
- Released: September 25, 2007
- Recorded: 2007
- Studio: Lions Den (Miami, FL); Right Track Studio (New York, NY); The Hit Factory (Miami, FL); SMT Studio (New York, NY); Circle House (Miami, FL); Vox Studio
- Genre: Hip hop; reggae
- Length: 56:54
- Label: AAO Music; Vox Music Group
- Producer: Ky-Mani Marley (exec.); Alex "Lex" Francis; BlackOut; Corey Chase; DannyBoyStyles; Jason "J-Vibe" Farmer; Ky Miller; Larry "Kalid" Chu; Mark Sparks; Red Spyda

Ky-Mani Marley chronology
Milestone (2004)	Radio (2007)	Maestro (2015)

Singles from Radio
- 1. "The March" Released: 2007

Professional ratings
Review scores
Source	Rating
AllMusic	4.5/5 stars
Robert Christgau	(dud)
The Phoenix	2.5/4 stars

Radio is the fifth solo studio album by Jamaican reggae musician Ky-Mani Marley. It was released on September 25, 2007, through AAO Music and Vox Music Group. Recording sessions took place at Lions Den, The Hit Factory and Circle House in Miami, at Right Track Studio and SMT Studio in New York, and at Vox Studio. Production was handled by Jason "J-Vibe" Farmer, Alex "Lex" Francis, Ky Miller, BlackOut, Corey Chase, DannyBoyStyles, Larry "Kalid" Chu, Mark Sparks and Red Spyda, with Ky-Mani serving as executive producer. It features guest appearances from Louie Rankin, Gail Gotti, Maintain, Mýa, Tessanne Chin and Young Buck.

The album did not reach the Billboard 200, however, it peaked at No. 38 on the Top R&B/Hip-Hop Albums, No. 19 on the Top Rap Albums, No. 27 on the Heatseekers Albums, and topped the Reggae Albums charts in the United States. Its lead single, "The March", made it to No. 95 on the Hot R&B/Hip-Hop Songs and No. 2 on the Hot R&B/Hip-Hop Singles Sales.

The album features much more hip hop influences than his previous releases.

== Track listing ==
No.	Title	Writer(s)	Producer(s)	Length
1.	"I'm Back" (featuring Young Buck and Louie Rankin)	Ky-Mani Marley; David Brown	Jason "J-Vibe" Farmer	3:21
2.	"The March"	K. Marley	Alex "Lex" Francis; Jason "J-Vibe" Farmer	4:10
3.	"Slow Roll" (featuring Gail Gotti)	K. Marley	Mark Sparks	4:04
4.	"One Time"	K. Marley	Ky Miller	4:22
5.	"Hustler"	K. Marley	Larry "Kalid" Chu	3:53
6.	"The Conversation" (featuring Tessanne Chin)	K. Marley; Tessanne Chin	Jason "J-Vibe" Farmer	4:40
7.	"Royal Vibes"	K. Marley	Jason "J-Vibe" Farmer	4:38
8.	"I Got You" (featuring Mýa)	K. Marley; Mýa Harrison	Ky Miller	3:37
9.	"Jezebel"	K. Marley	Corey Chase	4:27
10.	"So Hot"	K. Marley; Shaquel Leon	Jason "J-Vibe" Farmer	3:34
11.	"Ghetto Soldier" (featuring Maintain and Louie Rankin)	K. Marley; Shermain Ridgeway	Winston "Blackout" Thomas; Danny "Styles" Schofield	4:02
12.	"Breakdown"	K. Marley	Red Spyda	3:24
13.	"I Pray"	K. Marley	Jason "J-Vibe" Farmer	4:39
14.	"The March (Vox Spanish Remix)" (Bonus track)	K. Marley	Alex "Lex" Francis; Jason "J-Vibe" Farmer	4:12
Total length:				56:54

== Personnel ==
- Ky-Mani Marley – vocals, executive producer
- Leonard "Louie Rankin" Ford – vocals (tracks: 1, 11)
- David "Young Buck" Brown – vocals (track 1)
- JoVan "Gail Gotti" Brumfield Brown – vocals (track 3)
- Tessanne Chin – vocals (track 6)
- Mýa Harrison – vocals (track 8)
- Shermain "Maintain" Ridgeway – vocals (track 11)
- Esther Fortune – back-up vocals (tracks: 5, 7, 9)
- Imani Marley – back-up vocals (track 13)
- Jason "J-Vibe" Farmer – producer (tracks: 1, 2, 6, 7, 10, 13, 14)
- Alex "Lex" Francis – producer (tracks: 2, 14)
- Johnathan "Mark Sparks" Blount – producer (track 3)
- Kyeme "Ky" Miller – producer (tracks: 4, 8), recording (track 4)
- Larry "Kalid" Chu – producer (track 5)
- Corey Chase – producer (track 9)
- Winston "BlackOut" Thomas – producer (track 11)
- Daniel "DannyBoyStyles" Schofield – producer (track 11)
- Andy "Red Spyda" Thelusma – producer (track 12)
- Nikolas "Niko Don" Marzouca – recording (tracks: 1–3, 5–13), mixing (tracks: 1–13)
- Steve Sola – engineering & remixing (track 14)
- Arie Deutsch – remixing (track 14)
- Chris Gehringer – mastering
- Baja "Jah" – art direction, design
- John Price – art direction, design
- Roberto Chamorro – photography
- Shaquel Leon – stylist
- Hailu Panton – A&R
- "Smokin Joeh" Moore – A&R
- Norman "Purfek Storm" Ball – management
- Cleveland "PR" Earle – management
- Anthony "Free" Freeman – management
- Joe Milan – marketing
- OJ Wedlaw – promotion
- Ramon Digital – promotion
- Shawna Hilleary – legal

== Charts ==
Chart (2007)	Peak position
US Top R&B/Hip-Hop Albums (Billboard)	38
US Top Rap Albums (Billboard)	19
US Heatseekers Albums (Billboard)	27
US Reggae Albums (Billboard)	1
