= Beautiful Soul (Mamadee album) =

Studio album by Mamadee
- Released: January 25, 2013
- Genre: Reggae, pop, rock
- Length: 63:43
- Label: Born Free Records, distributed by Megawave Records
- Producer: Born Free (Executive Producer), Far East Band, Francis Kaumba, Willie Lindo, Earl "Chinna" Smith, Mamadee Wappler, Felix Wolter

Singles from Beautiful Soul
- 1. "Who I Am" Released: 7 December 2010; 2. "Africa is Calling" Released: 4 February 2011

Beautiful Soul is the first studio album by German singer Mamadee, released on January 25, 2013. Eleven of the songs on the album were recorded in Miami, USA, the others in Jamaica and Germany. The album was created with the support of Born Free a.k.a. Conrad Glaze from Born Free Records.

== Track listing ==
No.	Title	Lyrics	Music	Featuring	Length
1.	"Africa Is Calling" (Roots Mix)	Mamadee Wappler, Kymani Marley, Conrad Glaze	Conrad Glaze, Jan Magan a.k.a. Ganjaman	Ky-Mani Marley (Note: Ky-Mani Marley a.k.a. Kymani Marley)	3:34
2.	"Leader"	Mamadee Wappler	Conrad Glaze, Patrick Anthony, Willie Lindo		3:25
3.	"Let It Go"	Mamadee Wappler	Conrad Glaze, Patrick Anthony, Willie Lindo		4:28
4.	"Faith"	Mamadee Wappler	Kashief Lindo, Willie Lindo		3:37
5.	"Beautiful Soul" (Full Mix)	Mamadee Wappler, Everold Dwyer	Conrad Glaze, Willie Lindo		3:11
6.	"Give Something"	B. Bailey a.k.a. Jack Radics	Conrad Glaze, Willie Lindo		3:52
7.	"Hope"	Mamadee Wappler	Conrad Glaze, Hopetone Blazze		3:24
8.	"Who I Am" (Ganja Mix)	Conrad Glaze, Francis Kaumba, Mamadee Wappler, Marcus Son, Saney Cessay	Conrad Glaze, Jan Magan	Born Free, Pyton & Hurrican (Note: Born Free a.k.a. Conrad Glaze, Pyton a.k.a. Marcus Son, Hurrican a.k.a. Saney Cessay)	3:48
9.	"Don't Lose Yourself"	Mamadee Wappler	Kashief Lindo, Willie Lindo		3:47
10.	"Feathers"	Mamadee Wappler	Conrad Glaze, Willie Lindo, Raymond Wright		3:44
11.	"One World"	Mamadee Wappler	Kashief Lindo, Willie Lindo		3:44
12.	"See Me"	Mamadee Wappler	Far East Band (Note: Lyrics and Music published by copyright control. Far East Band guitar: Andreas Wendland / drums: Marco Baresi / guitar: Pete Fisher / keyboards: Peter Hirsch / bass: Andre Heyer / sax: Johanna Järemo / trumpet: Steffen Zimmer / trombone: Rob Gutowski / percussion: Felix Wolter)		4:34
13.	"Feel Good"	Mamadee Wappler	Conrad Glaze, Earl "Chinna" Smith, Mamadee Wappler		3:52
14.	"Beautiful Soul" (Acoustic)	Everold Dwyer, Mamadee Wappler	Conrad Glaze		4:13
15.	"Africa Is Calling" (Road of Life Riddim Mix)	Mamadee Wappler, Kymani Marley, Conrad Glaze	Conrad Glaze, Christopher Williams, Jahnoi Nunes, Chad Williamson	Ky-Mani Marley	3:23
16.	"Who I Am"	Conrad Glaze, Francis Kaumba, Mamadee Wappler, Marcus Son, Saney Cessay	Conrad Glaze, Francis Kaumba	Born Free, Pyton & Hurrican	3:42
17.	"Forgiveness" (Road of Life Riddim Mix)	Rainford Hugh Perry, Conrad Glaze	Conrad Glaze, Christopher Williams, Jahnoi Nunes, Chad Williamson	Lee "Scratch" Perry (Note: Lee "Scratch" Perry a.k.a. Rainford Hugh Perry)	3:25
