= Mamadee =

German reggae singer (born 1979)

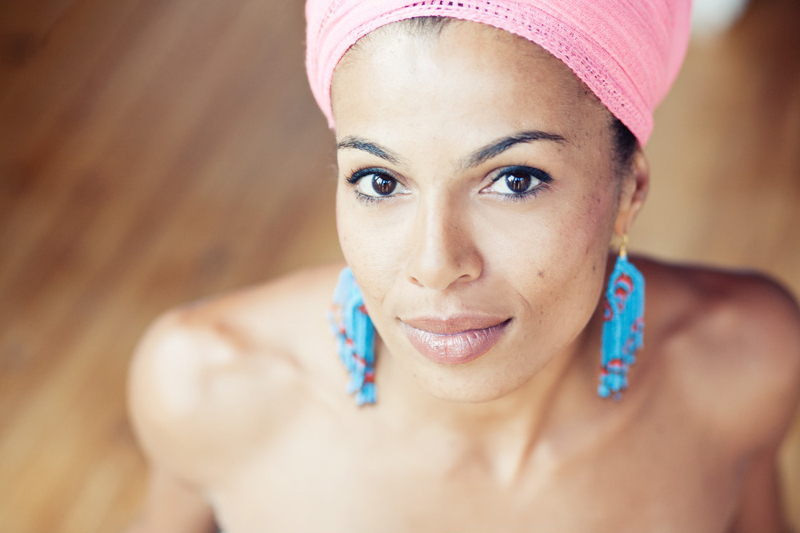
- Mamadee in 2012

Background information
- Born: Mamadie Wappler; 12 September 1979 (age 46); Dresden, East Germany
- Genres: Reggae, gospel, soul
- Occupation(s): Singer, songwriter
- Years active: 2000–present

Mamadie Wappler (born 12 September 1979), known professionally as Mamadee, is a German reggae singer.

== Family ==
Mamadee grew up with her parents, two sisters, and her grandparents in a small village called Altrottmannsdorf, near Zwickau as the youngest daughter of a father from Sierra Leone and a German mother. When she was five years old, she started to learn to play piano. In 1999, she moved to Cologne, where her sister lives, to become a singer.

== Music ==
Her first engagement in Cologne was as background singer for Pauls Club, a band which specialized in jazz and soul classics. After approaching the movement/band Brothers Keepers with her first own song Farbgesetz Mamadee, she became a member of their female version Sisters Keepers in 2000. Later she belonged to the management board of Sisters e.V.

Since her 2002 concert tour through Germany, she has accompanied Gentleman as a background singer until 2012. Her song Good Days, which she wrote and performed with the American singer Tamika, appears also on the album Gentleman & The Far East Band Live. She also contributed to several albums of other artists like Mellow Mark and Seeed.

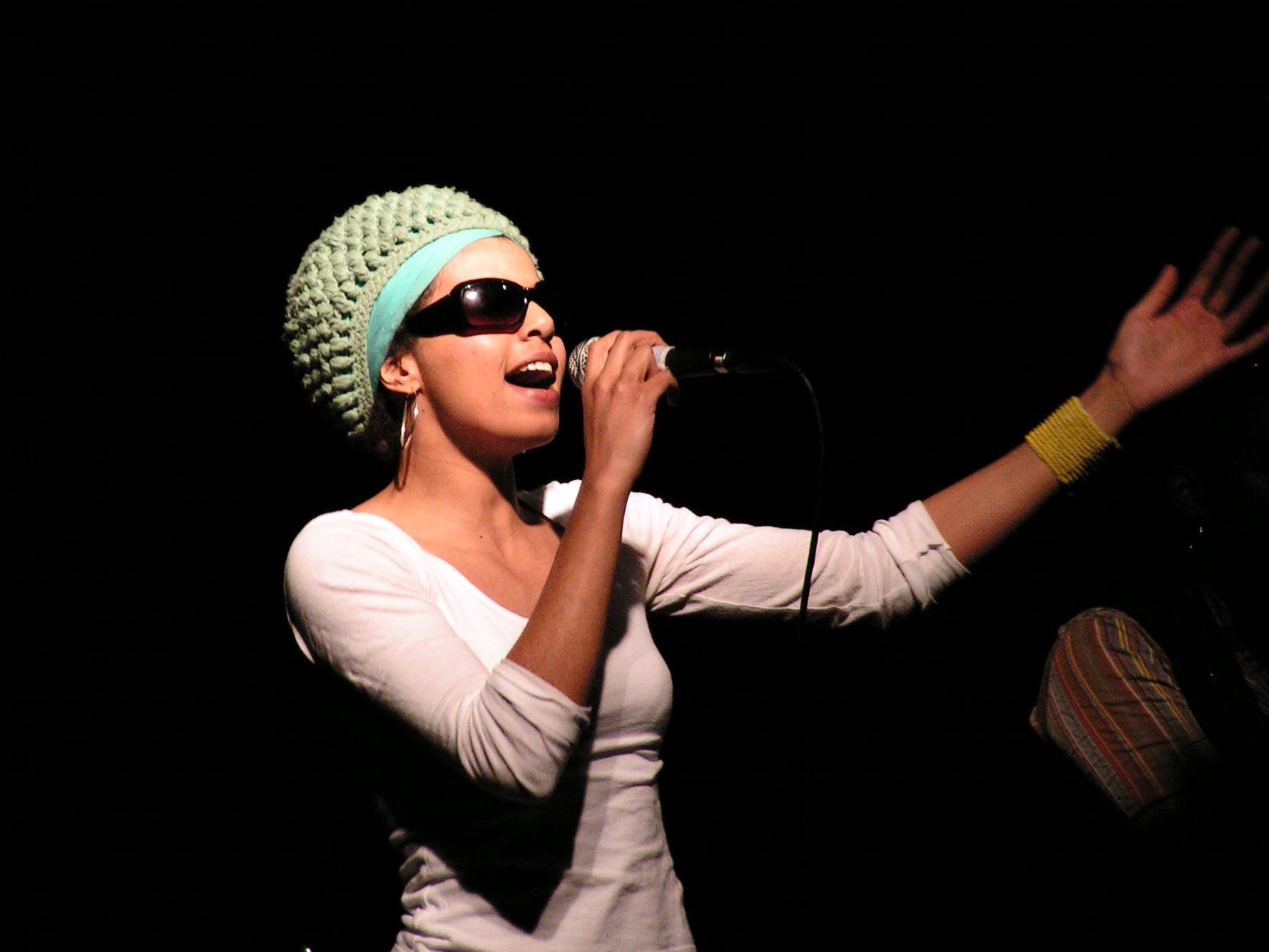
Mamadee in Milan, Italy in March 2007

Mamadee sings not exclusively reggae but also jazz, gospel and soul music. In 2005 her first own EP Lass los was released which contained nine tracks (besides six versions of the title song also Give Something an exclusively for Mamadee composed song by the Jamaican singer-songwriter Jack Radics, Hör nicht auf written by Mamadee herself and Trust In You produced by Gentleman). It was published by the label Bushhouse Records, which was founded by Gentleman and his manager Stephan Schulmeister in 2005. Lass los reached position 79 in the German charts. She also worked with Seeed and Andrew Tosh as background singer.

Together with Gentleman she performed "Lass los" at the Bundesvision Song Contest 2005 for the German state of North Rhine-Westphalia where they shared last place in the competition with Sandy Mölling who competed for the state of Rhineland-Palatinate.

In 2013, Mamadee published her first solo album Beautiful Soul which was recorded in Miami and produced by Conrad Glaze, founder and president of the music label Born Free Records.

== Film documentation ==
In 2007, director Sven Halfar produced the documentation Yes I Am in which the lives of Mamadee, Adé Bantu and D-Flame were portrayed. The film shows the career development of Afro-German musical artists and the problems they have encountered due to their skin color.

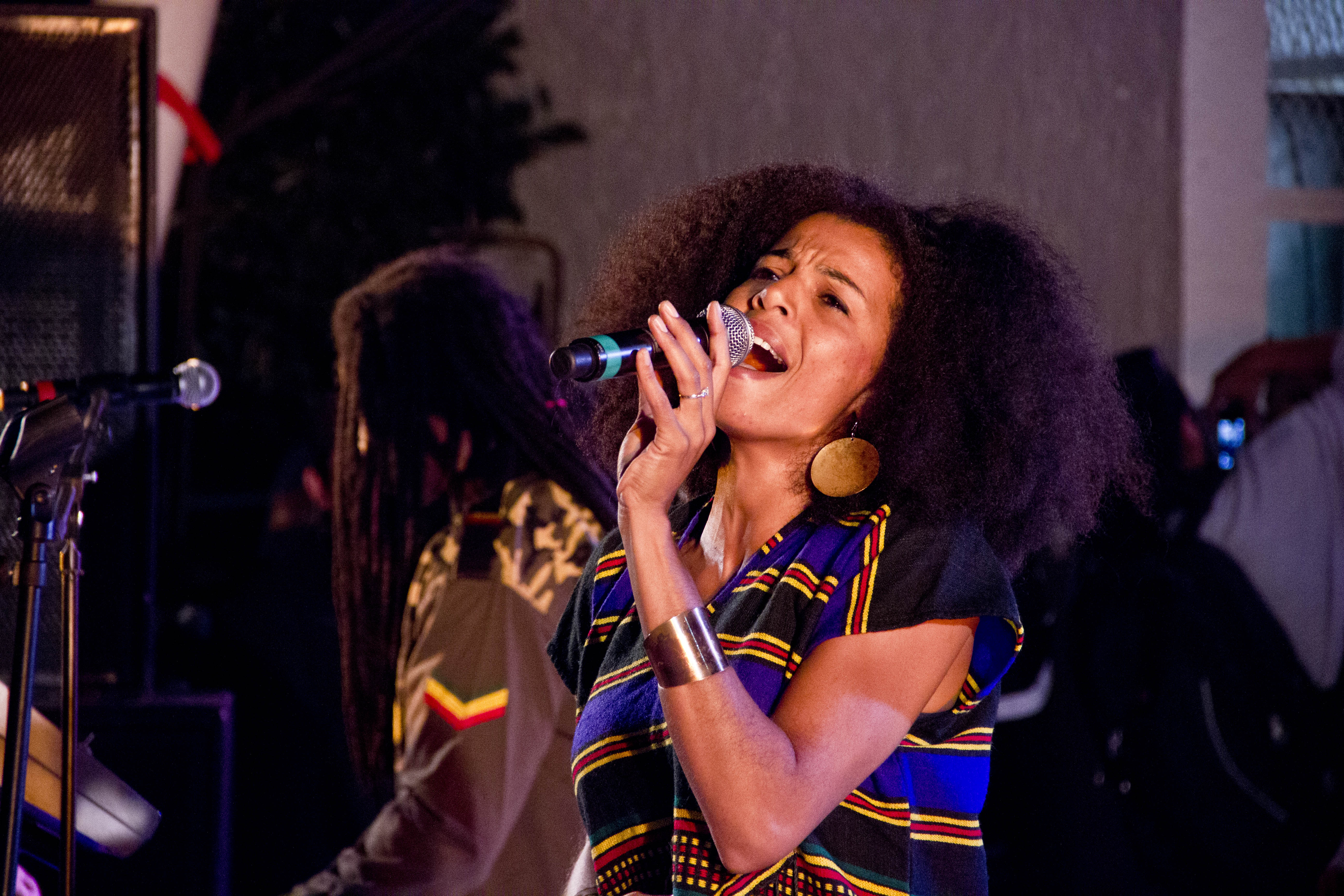
Mamadee at the Un Canto Por Africa festival, 24 March 2012 in Mexico

== Social engagement ==
Due to her own experience with discrimination during her teenage years in East Germany Mamadee champions against intolerance and xenophobia. She tried to come to terms with her own history in her song Farbgesetz which was featured in the Yes I Am documentation and did educational work for youths in schools since she joined in 2000 the non-profit association Sisters e.V. In February 2009 Mamadee finished her studies with a BA degree as certified social pedagogue.

== Discography ==
Albums

- Beautiful Soul (2013)

Single

- Who I Am (feat. Born Free, Pyton & Hurricane, 2010)
- Africa Is Calling (feat. Ky-Mani Marley, 2011)

EP

- Lass Los (2005)
- Good Days (with Tamika, 2007)

Contributions

- Turtle Bay Country Club: Kein Leichter Weg (with the songs "Baby" and "Kein leichter Weg")
- Brothers Keepers: Lightkultur (with the Sisters Keepers' song "Liebe & Verstand", 2001)
- Mellow Mark: Sturm ("Babies" feat. Mamadee, 2003)
- Gentleman & The Far East Band: Live (CD, DVD) (Backgroundsängerin; with the song "Good Days", 2003)
- Seeed: Musik Monks ("What You Deserve Is What You Get" & "Double Soul" feat. Mamadee, 2004)
- Gentleman – Diversity Live (DVD) (DVD 2: Live concert from the 25th anniversary of Summerjam Festival 2010 with the song "Beautiful Soul", 2011)
