= Like Father Like Son (Ky-Mani Marley album) =

Studio album by Ky-Mani Marley
- Released: August 2, 1996
- Recorded: United Kingdom
- Genre: Reggae
- Label: Warner Bros./Rhino
- Producer: David Lee, Ky-Mani Marley

Ky-Mani Marley chronology
Like Father Like Son (1996)	The Journey (2000)

Professional ratings
Review scores
Source	Rating
Allmusic	(not rated, no review) link

Like Father Like Son is the debut album by Ky-Mani Marley released on August 2, 1996, produced by David Lee. He is the son of reggae legend Bob Marley. The album features cover versions of some of Bob Marley's songs. The bass player is Robbie Shakespeare.

== Track listing ==
1. "Nice Time" – 2:46
2. "Nice Time (Dub Version)" – 2:45
3. "War" – 3:46
4. "War (Dub Version)" – 3:47
5. "Who The Cap Fit" – 3:37
6. "Who The Cap Fit (Dub Version)" – 3:38
7. "Bad Card" – 3:01
8. "Bad Card (Dub Version)" – 3:05
9. "Johnny Was" – 3:32
10. "Johnny Was (Dub Version)" – 3:33
11. "Soul Rebel" – 3:36
12. "Soul Rebel (Dub Version)" – 3:42
13. "Africa Unite" – 2:49
14. "Africa Unite (Dub Version)" – 2:50
15. "Kinky Reggae" – 3:39
16. "Kinky Reggae (Dub Version)" – 4:10
17. "No Woman, No Cry" – 3:48
18. "No Woman, No Cry (Dub Version)" – 3:46
19. "So Jah Seh" – 4:03
20. "So Jah Seh (Dub Version)" – 4:02
21. "Small Axe" – 3:47
22. "Small Axe (Dub Version)" – 3:52
