= Conversations (Gentleman and Ky-Mani Marley album) =

Studio album by Gentleman & Ky-Mani Marley
- Released: June 26, 2016
- Studios: Circle House Studios (Miami, FL); Soulfood Studios
- Genre: Reggae
- Labels: Island; Vertigo/Capitol
- Producers: Ben Bazzazian; Boris Rogowski; Clayton Morrison; Di Genius; Gentleman; Jugglerz; Ky-Mani Marley; Supa Dups

Gentleman chronology
New Day Dawn (2013)	Conversations (2016)	Blaue Stunde (2020)

Ky-Mani Marley chronology
Maestro (2015)	Conversations (2016)

Professional ratings
Review scores
Source	Rating
laut.de	5/5 stars

Conversations is a collaborative studio album by German reggae musician Gentleman and Jamaican reggae/hip-hop artist Ky-Mani Marley. It was released on June 26, 2016, through Island/Vertigo/Capitol. Recording sessions took place at Circle House Studios in North Miami, Florida and at Soulfood Studios. Production was handled by Gentleman, Clayton Morrison, Ben Bazzazian,Supa Dups, Boris Rogowski, Di Genius, Jugglerz and Ky-Mani Marley, with Rolf Radny serving as executive producer. It features guest appearance from Marcia Griffiths on the cover version of The Wailers' song "Simmer Down".

The album peaked at number 4 on the Swiss Hitparade, number 6 in Austria, number 8 in Germany, number 139 in Flanders and number 156 in the Netherlands. It also made it to number 4 on the US Billboard Reggae Albums chart.

Music videos were released for eight songs—"Signs of the Times", "Mama" and "Simmer Down (Control Your Temper)" were directed by Noël Dernesch, "Tomorrow", "Uprising", "No Solidarity", "Motivation" and "How I Feel" were directed by Henning Brix.

== Track listing ==
No.	Title	Writer(s)	Producer(s)	Length
1.	"Signs of the Times"	Tilmann Otto; Ky-Mani Marley; Clayton Morrison	Gentleman; Clay	3:47
2.	"Skit 1"			0:22
3.	"Tomorrow"	Otto; K. Marley; Everold "Daddy Rings" Dwyer; Ben Bazzazian	Gentleman; Ben Bazzazian	3:53
4.	"Questions"	Otto; K. Marley; Morrison	Gentleman; Clay	3:32
5.	"Skit 2"			0:29
6.	"Jah Guide Over Us"	Otto; K. Marley; Dwayne Chin-Quee; Stephen McGregor	Supa Dups; Di Genius	4:09
7.	"Mama"	Otto; K. Marley; Dwyer; Chin-Quee	Supa Dups	3:36
8.	"Simmer Down" (featuring Marcia Griffiths)	Bob Marley; Otto; Dwyer	Gentleman; Clay	2:39
9.	"Red Town"	Otto; Morrison	Gentleman; Clay	3:42
10.	"Hey"	K. Marley	Ky-Mani Marley	4:35
11.	"Skit 3"			0:33
12.	"Uprising"	Otto; K. Marley; Dwyer; Morrison	Gentleman; Clay	3:08
13.	"No Solidarity"	Otto; K. Marley; Dwyer; Bazzazian; Boris Rogowski	Ben Bazzazian; Boris Rogowski	3:24
14.	"Way Out"	Otto; K. Marley; Morrison	Gentleman; Clay	3:37
15.	"Skit 4"			0:21
16.	"How I Feel"	Otto; K. Marley; Dwyer; Bazzazian	Gentleman; Ben Bazzazian	3:47
17.	"Motivation"	Otto; K. Marley; Dwyer; Martin Peter Willumeit; Jonas Nikolaus Lang; Paul Philipp Spurny; Sahin Kablan	Jugglerz	3:13
18.	"Quality of Life"	Otto; K. Marley; Morrison	Gentleman; Clay	3:09

== Additional personnel ==
- Rolf Radny – executive producer
- Kevin Metcalfe – mastering
- Henning Brix – artwork
- Pascal Bünning – photography

== Charts ==
Chart (2016)	Peak position
Austrian Albums (Ö3 Austria)	6
Belgian Albums (Ultratop Flanders)	139
Dutch Albums (Album Top 100)	156
German Albums (Offizielle Top 100)	8
Swiss Albums (Schweizer Hitparade)	4
US Reggae Albums (Billboard)	4
