= Shottas =

- Release poster
- Directed by: Cess Silvera
- Written by: Cess Silvera
- Produced by: Cess Silvera
- Starring: Ky-Mani Marley; Spragga Benz; Paul Campbell; Louie Rankin
- Cinematography: Cliff Charles
- Edited by: Danny Saphire
- Music by: Stephen Marley
- Production company: Lucky Bastard Films Production
- Distributed by: Triumph Films; Destination Films
- Release date: 27 February 2002
- Running time: 95 minutes
- Countries: Jamaica; United States
- Languages: Jamaican Patois; English

Shottas is a 2002 Jamaican-American crime film about two young men who participate in organized crime in Kingston and Miami. It stars Ky-Mani Marley, Spragga Benz, Paul Campbell and Louie Rankin and was written, produced and directed by Cess Silvera. Despite its low budget, the distribution of an unfinished bootleg made it a cult favourite long before its official limited release in the United States by Triumph Films and Destination Films in 2006.

== Plot ==
Biggs (Errol) (Ky-Mani Marley) and Wayne (Spragga Benz), are two young men who grow up together in the tough and dangerous streets of Kingston. They rob a soda truck and shoot the truck driver while they are still children.

The robbery money is used to purchase visas to go the United States, where they continue their criminal activities, hustling on the streets of Miami. Twenty years later, Biggs is deported to Jamaica where Wayne and Mad Max (Paul Campbell), also deported, have continued their surge in crime by extorting money from businessmen. After facing problems with the police and politicians, the two head back to Miami alongside Mad Max. Upon returning, they are informed that Miami has a new drug kingpin, Teddy Bruck Shut (Louie Rankin).

The three men visit Teddy in an attempt to extort him. They then use intimidation and violence to rise to the top of the Miami underworld. Their ambitions ultimately end in a violent shootout, during which Teddy’s associates kill Wayne and Raquel and shoot Max. Biggs is nearly killed while comforting Wayne on his deathbed, but Max shoots the attacker before he can strike.

After taking Max to the hospital, Biggs goes to Teddy's house and murders him, his bodyguard and his girlfriend. Biggs then takes all the money and gets on a boat, presumably to Los Angeles, as he mentioned purchasing a house there prior to the massive firefight.

== Cast ==
- Ky-Mani Marley as Errol "Biggs" Williams
- Louie Rankin as "Teddy Bruckshot"
- Corey Agnant as "Richie's Son"
- Judith Bodley as "Mr. Chin's Secretary"
- Spragga Benz as "Wayne Smith"
- Paul Campbell as "Mad Max"
- Stephen Cheong as "Mr. Chin"
- Flippa Mafia as "John John"
- Assassin as "Blacka"
- Fabienne Dominique as "Abbey"
- Michael Gordon as "Soda Truck Driver"
- Carlton Grant Jr. as "Young Wayne"
- Leighton Hilton as "Airport Cop #2"
- Wyclef Jean as "Richie Effs"
- DJ Khaled as "Richie's henchman"
- Papa Keith as "Carjack Victim"
- Desmond Kingas "Big Man"
- Isiah Laing as "Detective Laing"
- Marilyn Manhoe as "Marcia"
- Jabba Mitchell as "Dangles"
- Claudette Pious as "Auntie Pauline"
- Prince Reed as "Jitney Driver"
- Dwight Richardson as "Immigration Inspector"
- Macka Diamond
- Patrick Scott as "Sando"
- J.R. Silvera as "young Biggs".
- Jennifer Small as "Mr. Anderson's Secretary"
- Jahshi Spence as "Rasta Neville"
- Prince Thompson as "Ol' School"
- Rohan Wade as "Airport Cop #1"
- Munair Zacca as "Mr. Anderson"
- Nelson Zapata as "Papi"
- San San as "Raquel"
- Screechie Bop as "Gussy"

== Soundtrack ==
- Damian Marley – Welcome to Jamrock
- Barry Brown – Far East
- Nitty Gritty – Trial and Crosses
- Little John – In the Ghetto
- Bob Marley – Coming in From the Cold
- Bounty Killer – Dead This Time
- Hawkeye – Bad Long Time
- Spragga Benz & Lady Saw – Backshot
- Damian Marley – Catch a Fire
- Shaggy and the Big Yard Allstars – Gangster
- Tonto Irie – It a Ring
- Ky-Mani Marley – Fire
- Junior Cat – Would A Let You Go
- Pinchers – Bandelero
- John Wayne – Call the Police
- Nicky Seizure – Quench the Fire
- Ky-Mani Marley – I Believe
- Ky-Enie – Rain
- Inner Circle – Discipline Child (Live)
- Nicky Seizure – Revelation time
- Ky-Mani Marley – The March
- Kenneth Milligan – Shottas
- Pan Head – Gun Man Tune
- Big Yard – Gangsters

== Reception ==
On the review aggregator website Rotten Tomatoes, the film has a score of 17% based on reviews from 18 critics.

== See also ==
- List of hood films
