= Confidence (Gentleman album) =

Studio album by Gentleman
- Released: 30 August 2004
- Genre: Reggae
- Length: 74:40
- Label: Four Music

Gentleman chronology
Gentleman & The Far East Band Live (2003)	Confidence (2004)	Another Intensity (2007)

Confidence is the third studio album by German Reggae artist Gentleman. It was released by Four Music on 30 August 2004 in German-speaking Europe.

== Critical reception ==
Professional ratings
Review scores
Source	Rating
laut.de	4/5 stars

Laut.de editor Tobias Kraus rated the album four stars out of five and felt that Confidence represents Gentleman's "consistent development" toward "conscious roots and culture reggae," proving that he had matured artistically and earned a place in the international reggae scene. He praised the album as "roots reggae with heart and soul," highlighting its musical quality, rich arrangements, and lasting appeal, and even suggested it might be Gentleman's strongest album so far.

== Commercial performance ==
Confidence marked Gentleman's commercial breakthrough and became his highest-charting album at the time. The album reached number one on both the German and Austrian album charts, while also peaking at number four in Switzerland. Its success continued throughout the year, appearing on the 2004 year-end charts in all three countries and remaining on the German year-end chart in 2005. The album was also certified Platinum in Germany for shipments of over 200,000 copies and received a Gold certification in Switzerland for more than 20,000 units sold, confirming Gentleman’s growing mainstream popularity beyond the reggae scene.

== Track listing ==
1. "Send a Prayer" – 3:50
2. "Superior" – 3:45
3. "Caan Hold Us Down" (featuring Barrington Levy, Daddy Rings) – 3:23
4. "Intoxication" – 4:13
5. "New Day" – 3:34
6. "Be Yourself" (featuring Cocoa Tea) – 3:48
7. "All That You Had" – 3:54
8. "Life Takes More Than That" – 3:02
9. "Rumours" – 3:18
10. "Weary No More" (featuring Tamika) – 3:38
11. "After a Storm" – 4:21
12. "Unconditional Love" – 4:02
13. "Face off" (featuring Anthony B) – 4:22
14. "Strange Things" – 4:07
15. "Blessing of Jah" (featuring Ras Shiloh) – 3:48
16. "Church and State" – 3:38
17. "Lion's Den" – 3:52
18. "Mystic Wind" (featuring Tony Rebel) – 3:50
19. "For the Children" – 3:16
20. "No Time Like Now" (featuring Jack Radics) – 3:23

== Charts ==
=== Weekly charts ===
Weekly chart performance for Confidence
Chart (2004)	Peak position
Austrian Albums (Ö3 Austria)	1
German Albums (Offizielle Top 100)	1
Swiss Albums (Schweizer Hitparade)	4

=== Year-end charts ===
2004 year-end chart performance for Confidence
Chart (2004)	Position
Austrian Albums (Ö3 Austria)	66
German Albums (Offizielle Top 100)	33
Swiss Albums (Schweizer Hitparade)	53

2005 year-end chart performance for Confidence
Chart (2005)	Position
German Albums (Offizielle Top 100)	83

== Certifications ==
Certifications for Confidence
Region	Certification	Certified units/sales
Germany (BVMI)	Platinum	200,000^{^}
Switzerland (IFPI Switzerland)	Gold	20,000^{^}
^{*} Sales figures based on certification alone.^{^} Shipments figures based on certification alone.
