= Another Intensity =

Studio album by Gentleman
- Released: 2007
- Genre: Reggae
- Length: 71:11
- Label: Four Music

Gentleman chronology
Confidence (2004)	Another Intensity (2007)	Diversity (2010)

Another Intensity is the fourth LP released by reggae artist Gentleman. The Far East Band takes part in the achievement of this album.

== Track listing ==
1. "Evolution" - 3:49
2. "Tranquility (Acoustic)" - 3:19
3. "Lack of Love" (featuring Sizzla) - 4:01
4. "Different Places" - 3:55
5. "Round the World" - 4:07
6. "Serenity" - 4:08
7. "Soulfood" - 3:51
8. "Celebration" (featuring Alborosie) - 4:01
9. "Mount Zion" (featuring IAM) - 3:40
10. "The Light Within" (featuring Diana King) - 3:56
11. "In Pursuit of Happiness" - 3:52
12. "Rage & Anger" - 3:11
13. "Respond to Yourself" - 4:32
14. "Missing Those Days" - 3:38
15. "Hosanna" - 4:51
16. "Jah Love" (featuring Jack Radics, Daddy Rings) - 3:55
17. "Sin City" - 8:16

== Charts ==
=== Weekly charts ===
Weekly chart performance for Another Intensity
Chart (2007)	Peak position
Austrian Albums (Ö3 Austria)	5
German Albums (Offizielle Top 100)	2
Swiss Albums (Schweizer Hitparade)	2

=== Year-end charts ===
Year-end chart performance for Another Intensity
Chart (2007)	Position
Swiss Albums (Schweizer Hitparade)	84
