= The Journey (Ky-Mani Marley album) =

Studio album by Ky-Mani Marley
- Released: July 27, 1999
- Genre: Reggae
- Length: 1:00:54
- Label: Gee Street; V2
- Producer: Jon Baker (exec.); Neil Robertson (exec.); Clifton Dillon (also exec.); Christopher Garvey; Denroy Morgan; Derrick Barnett; Eddison Electrik; Ky-Mani Marley; Morgan Heritage; Roy Jobe; Salaam Remi; Tony "CD" Kelly; Willie Lindo

Ky-Mani Marley chronology
Like Father Like Son (1996)	The Journey (1999)	Many More Roads (2001)

Professional ratings
Review scores
Source	Rating
AllMusic	3/5 stars

The Journey is the second studio album by Ky-Mani Marley. It was released on July 27, 1999 through Gee Street Records. Production was handled by Clifton Dillon, Eddison Electrik, Roy Jobe, Denroy Morgan, Morgan Heritage, Salaam Remi, Christopher Garvey, Derrick Barnett, Tony "CD" Kelly, Willie Lindo, and Ky-Mani Marley himself. It features guest appearance from Peter Morgan.

The album received good reviews and is Ky-Mani's first album featuring his own songs. The most notable song from this album eventually became "Dear Dad", with lyrics taken from a letter Ky-Mani wrote as a child to his father, Bob Marley, after he died.

== Track listing ==
No.	Title	Producer(s)	Length
1.	"Rude Boy"	Eddison Electrik; Salaam Remi	3:44
2.	"Fell in Love" (featuring Peter Morgan)	Denroy Morgan; Morgan Heritage	4:37
3.	"Country Journey"	Denroy Morgan; Morgan Heritage	4:31
4.	"Dear Dad"	Clifton Dillon	3:58
5.	"Return of a King"	Clifton Dillon; Roy Jobe	4:59
6.	"Emperor"	Clifton Dillon; Willie Lindo	4:39
7.	"Party's On"	Eddison Electrik; Salaam Remi; Mike Clarke (co.)	3:57
8.	"Hi-Way"	Clifton Dillon; Roy Jobe	4:19
9.	"Tom Drunk"	Clifton Dillon; Eddison Electrik	5:00
10.	"No Faith"	Tony "CD" Kelly	3:56
11.	"Your Love"	Clifton Dillon; Roy Jobe	4:53
12.	"Fire, Fire"	Clifton Dillon; Derrick Barnett	4:07
13.	"Warriors"	Christopher Garvey; Ky-Mani Marley	4:07
14.	"Lord Is My Shepherd"	Clifton Dillon	4:07
Total length:			1:00:54

== Charts ==
Chart (1999)	Peak position
US Reggae Albums (Billboard)	6
