= Many More Roads =

Studio album by Ky-Mani Marley
- Released: May 29, 2001
- Genre: Reggae
- Length: 46:09
- Label: AO! Records
- Producer: Chris "Riddim Fingaz" Garvey; Clifton "Specialist" Dillon; Derrick "Sagittarius" Barnett; Lincoln Ward; Michael "Jah Mike" Coburn

Ky-Mani Marley chronology
The Journey (2000)	Many More Roads (2001)	Milestone (2004)

Professional ratings
Review scores
Source	Rating
AllMusic	3/5 stars

Many More Roads is the third studio album by Jamaican reggae artist Ky-Mani Marley. It was released on May 29, 2001, through Artists Only! Records. Production was handled by Lincoln Ward, Michael Coburn, Christopher Garvey, Clifton Dillon and Derrick Barnett, with Tyrone Smith serving as executive producer. It was nominated for a Grammy Award for Best Reggae Album at the 44th Annual Grammy Awards, but lost to his brother Damian Marley's album Halfway Tree.

== Track listing ==
No.	Title	Writer(s)	Producer(s)	Length
1.	"Who We Are"	Ky-Mani Marley; Kevin Batchelor; Philip Henry; George Miller; Gerald Johnson; Paul Crossdale; Donald Dennis; Kent Bryan	Lincoln Ward; Jah Mike; Chris "Riddim Fingaz"	3:53
2.	"Many More Roads"	Marley; Batchelor; Christopher Garvey; Derrick Barnett; Ricky Myrie; Bryan	Lincoln Ward; Jah Mike	3:49
3.	"Heart of a Lion"	Marley; Batchelor; Johnson; Myrie	Lincoln Ward; Jah Mike	3:44
4.	"Yesterday"	Marley; Batchelor; Henry; Miller; Johnson	Lincoln Ward; Jah Mike	4:02
5.	"Freedom"	Marley; Batchelor; Johnson; Donald Greaves; Garvey; Barnett	Chris "Riddim Fingaz"; Specialist; Derrick Barnett	3:49
6.	"Love in the Morning"	Marley; Henry; Miller; Rolando McLean	Lincoln Ward; Jah Mike	3:55
7.	"Ska-Ba-Dar"	Marley; Batchelor; Henry; Miller; Crossdale; Bryan	Lincoln Ward; Jah Mike	3:49
8.	"Valley of Decision"	Marley; Batchelor; Greaves; Garvey; Barnett; Clifton Dillon; Myrie; Hit Squad Lunatics	Lincoln Ward; Jah Mike	3:49
9.	"Giving I a Fight"	Marley; McLean	Lincoln Ward; Jah Mike	3:59
10.	"In a de Dance"	Marley; Henry; Greaves; Dennis; Garvey; Barnett	Lincoln Ward; Jah Mike; Chris "Riddim Fingaz"; Specialist; Derrick Barnett	3:43
11.	"Warning"	Marley; Batchelor; Henry; Johnson; Crossdale; Dennis; Myrie; Luther McKenzie	Lincoln Ward; Jah Mike	3:47
12.	"Hailie I"	Marley; Miller; Greaves; Garvey; Dillon; Hit Squad Lunatics	Chris "Riddim Fingaz"; Specialist; Derrick Barnett	3:50
Total length:				46:09

== Personnel ==
- Ky-Mani Marley – vocals & songwriter
- Philip "El Mono" Henry – guitar & songwriter (tracks: 1, 4, 6, 7, 10, 11)
- Donald "Danny Bassie" Dennis – bass & songwriter (tracks: 1, 10, 11)
- Paul Crossdale – keyboards & songwriter (tracks: 1, 7, 11)
- Rolando "Yami Bolo" McLean – keyboards & songwriter (tracks: 6, 9)
- George Miller – drums & songwriter (tracks: 1, 2, 4, 6, 7, 12)
- Gerald "Jerry" Johnson – saxophone & songwriter (tracks: 1, 3–5, 11)
- Donald "Yeashkark" Greaves – horn & songwriter (tracks: 5, 8, 10, 12)
- Kevin Batchelor – trumpet & songwriter (tracks: 1–5, 7, 8, 11)
- John Wesley "J.D. Smoothe" Lewis – backing vocals
- La Venia Irene "Bunny" Brissett – backing vocals
- Nadine Sutherland – backing vocals
- Marcia Griffiths – backing vocals
- Kimberly Miller – backing vocals
- Ken Miller – backing vocals
- Chris "Riddim Fingaz" Garvey – songwriter (tracks: 2, 5, 8, 10, 12), producer (tracks: 1, 5, 10, 12)
- Ricky Myrie – songwriter (tracks: 2, 3, 8, 11)
- Derrick Barnett – songwriter (tracks: 2, 5, 8, 10), producer (tracks: 5, 10, 12)
- Kent Bryan – songwriter (tracks: 1, 2, 7)
- Clifton Dillon – songwriter (tracks: 8, 12), producer (tracks: 5, 10, 12)
- Hit Squad Lunatics – songwriter (tracks: 8, 12)
- Luther McKenzie – songwriter (track 11)
- Lincoln Ward – producer (tracks: 1–4, 6–11)
- Michael Coburn – producer (tracks: 1–4, 6–11)
- Adam Hornyak – engineering
- Andy Kerr – mixing
- Cedrica Anthony "Soldgie" Hamilton – mixing
- Lynford "Fatta" Marshall – mixing
- Gerry McCarthy – sequencer
- Dale Ashley – mastering
- Mark Tomase – mastering
- Tyrone Smith – executive producer
- Julio Rojas – design
- Kevin Knight – photography

== Charts ==
Chart (2001)	Peak position
US Reggae Albums (Billboard)	8
