= Onejiru =

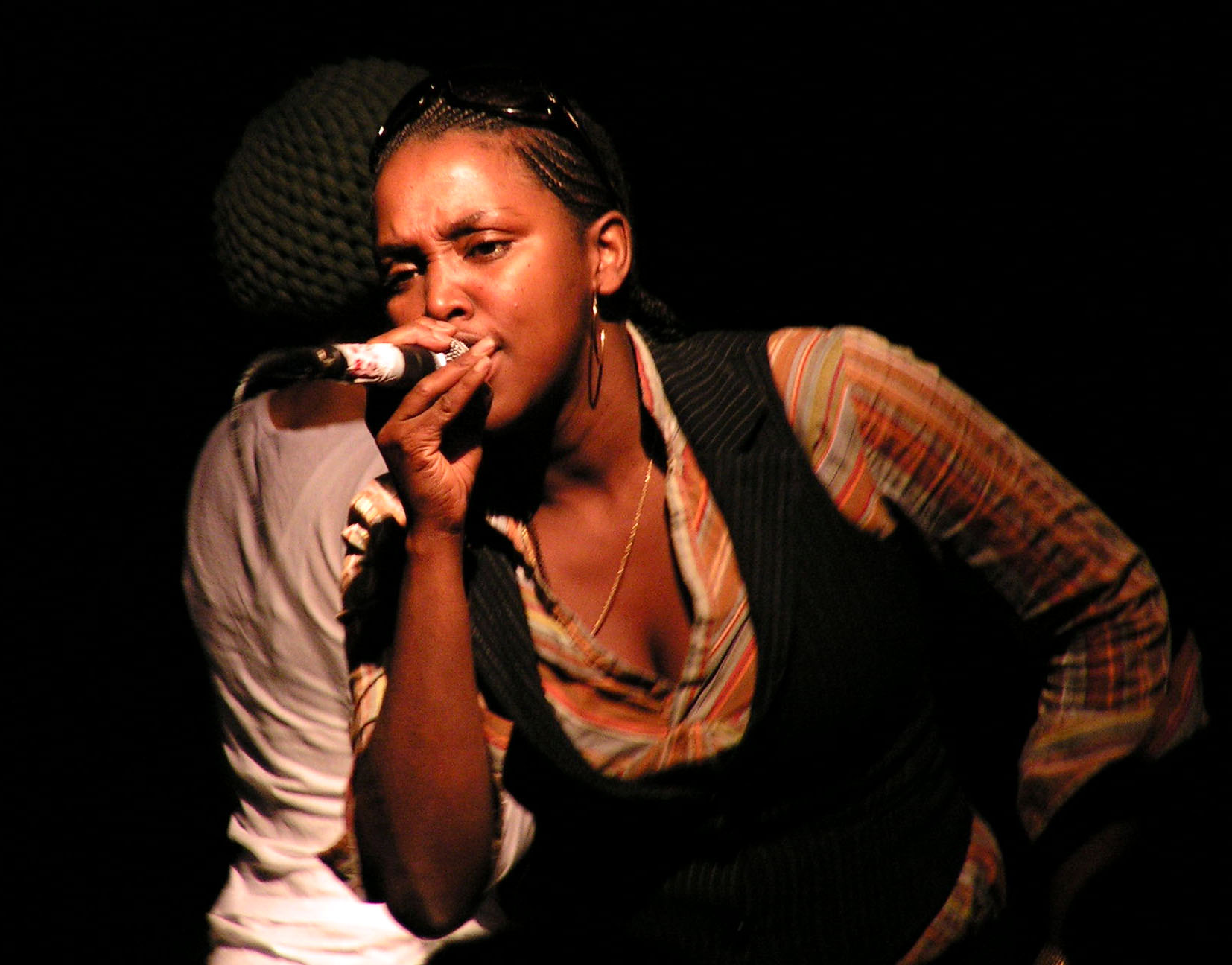
- Born: Pielina Wanjiru Schindler; Nairobi, Kenya
- Other names: Onejiro Schindler
- Occupations: Singer, member of the Sisters
- Known for: Lyrics in Kiswahili, supports gender equality

Onejiru (born Pielina Wanjiru Schindler) is a contemporary Germany-based jazz singer. She was born in Kenya and moved to Germany when she was a teenager.

== Life as an artist ==
Born in Kenya, Pielina Wanjiru Schindler grew up in Wanne-Eickel, Germany, where her musical experience started in a girls' choir and ballet lessons. Early on in her career as a singer, and by the name of Onejiru, she became a member of Helge Schneider's band Fighters. Onejiro toured Germany and Austria, then also sang on the albums of Jan Delay, Sam Ragga Band (Loktown Hi-Life, 2003) and Matthias Arfmann. The album "Prophets of Profit" was released in 2006. She is a member of the Sisters Keepers, an all female band of singers, and they entered Gender Riots singing Unite, ranked 14th at the Bundesvision Song Contest 2008, North Rhine-Westphalia.

On October 11, 2012, the Sisters were invited to the first United Nations International Day of the Girl, and they selected the song "Because I am a Girl". They have been ambassadors for the campaign since 2010, realizing UN World Girls Day is a campaign to have equal rights for girls and boys. The song "Because I am a Girl" was composed for the campaign. During their visit, the Sisters performed at the B. B. King Blues Club in NY.

With the Sisters, she was invited to Cologne for the 14th Afrikan Film Festival in September 2016, since their activities fit the event's theme was “Sisters in African Cinema”. The Sisters, then named Sister Keepers before 2005 for anti-racism, expanded their focus and in 2010, visited schools in Hamburg, Germany in events hosted by the German Federal Agency for Civic Education (Bundeszentrale für politische Bildung “bpb”). The program included works to empower girls, with dance and singing classes in which girls and boys learnt to work together. Those programs offered a chance for students to reflect on life in multicultural settings, including the issue of "Afro-Germans – Foreign in your own country". Collaboration with Plan International invited the Sisters to tour Brazil, Ghana, Togo, as well as cities in Germany for the project "Girls go for Goals" in 2011.

== Kenyan heritage ==
Onejiro featured in the documentary film, Black Milk- Halbschwarz geht nicht (English: Black Milk- Half-black doesn’t work), which was created by director Britta Wandaogo, a story about a Kenyan woman between "home and foreign" countries. When Onejiru visited Kenya at the age of 22, it had been 10 years since she moved to Germany, and she realized that living in Germany made her grow accustomed to the cultural environment in Germany against her roots in Kikuyu culture. That notion lead her to a conflict of her heart against educated mind. The film followed her dealing with the struggle to finally find peace of mind and recognize that her identity is not split between being a Kenyan and living in Germany.

I don’t have to cower myself – I’m already black!

The film "Black Milk- Halbschwarz geht nicht" was nominated for the 21st International Film Festival Emden-Norderney in 2009 and entered for the DMG Award.

In 2014, Onejiro went on a tour to Addis Abeba for a non-profit organization Viva con Agua for the cause of clean drinking water and performed as a guest singer at a concert by Gentleman with Tamika, Ivy Quainoo and Silly Walks. At Addis Abeba, they sang the song "Ethiopia Calling". That tour continued to Kenya, where she appeared on stage with Marteria and Maeckes, as well as Octopizzo.

== Discography ==
- 2003: Wasser (Sam Ragga Band, featuring Onejiru) Produced by Silly Walks Discotheque
- 2003: Loktown Hi-Life (Sam Ragga Band, with FlowinImmO or arias ImmO, Samy Deluxe, Jan Delay and Onejiru)
- 2003: Heaven (Turtle Bay Country Club featuring Onejiru & Patrice) from album "Universal Monstershark" Later covered by Onejiru in album "Prophets of Profit"
- 2005: From a New World – Recomposed (Deutsche Grammophon) Berliner Philharmoniker and Herbert von Karajan. Matthias Arfmann, Onejiru (2009-03-07 ed.). Berlin: Deutsche Grammophon GmbH [Symphony No.9 In E Minor, Op.95 "From The New World" (Remix) Symphony No.9 In E Minor, Op.95 "From The New World" (Remix)]. ;
- 2006: Prophets of Profit (Golden Delicious Music)
- 2006: Motorcitysoul – INFRACom
- 2008: Gender Riots Sisters (de), Echo Beach (Indigo (de))

=== Compilation contributions ===
- 2006: Prophets Of Profit compiled in Tageszeitung – Inter Deutschland: Neue Hymnen und Songs zur WM 2006
- 2008 We Carry On compiled in Remixes

== See also ==
- Reggae
- Women's rights movement in Germany
- Kiswahili
