= Diversity (album) =

Studio album by Gentleman
- Released: 2010
- Genre: Reggae
- Label: Island

Gentleman chronology
| Another Intensity (2007) | Diversity (2010) | Diversity Live (2011) |

Diversity is the fifth LP released by the reggae artist Gentleman.

== Track listing ==
1. "The Reason" - 2:51
2. "Ina Time Like Now" - 3:09
3. "Lonely Days" - 3:16
4. "Regardless" - 3:20
5. "It No Pretty" - 3:07
6. "I Got To Go" - 3:50
7. "The Finish Line" - 3:33
8. "Changes" - 3:22
9. "To The Top" (Feat. Christopher Martin) - 3:08
10. "No Time To Play" - 3:18
11. "Fast Forward" - 3:33
12. "Hold On Strong" - 3:46
13. "Moment Of Truth" - 3:16
14. "Tempolution" (Feat. Red Roze) - 4:11
15. "Another Melody" (Feat. Tanya Stephens) - 4:00
16. "Help" (Feat. Million Stylez) - 3:53
17. "Along The Way" (Feat. Patrice) - 3:32
18. "Good Old Days" (Feat. Sugar Minott) - 3:30
19. "Everlasting Love" - 3:12

== Charts ==
=== Weekly charts ===
| Chart (2010) | Peak position |
|---|---|
| Austrian Albums (Ö3 Austria) | 2 |
| French Albums (SNEP) | 146 |
| German Albums (Offizielle Top 100) | 1 |
| Swiss Albums (Schweizer Hitparade) | 2 |

=== Year-end charts ===
| Chart (2010) | Position |
|---|---|
| German Albums (Offizielle Top 100) | 63 |
| Swiss Albums (Schweizer Hitparade) | 69 |

== Certifications ==
Certifications for Diversity
| Region | Certification | Certified units/sales |
|---|---|---|
| Germany (BVMI) | Gold | 100,000^{^} |
^{*} Sales figures based on certification alone.^{^} Shipments figures based on certification alone.
