= Tamika =

Tamika is a feminine given name. It is considered to be an African-American name in the United States.

Notable people with this name include:

- Tamika Catchings, American basketball player
- Tamika D. Mallory, American activist
- Tamika Domrow, Australian swimmer
- Tamika Lawrence, American actress
- Tamika Louis, American basketball coach
- Tamika Scott, American singer
- Tamika Whitmore, American basketball player
- Tamika Williams, American basketball player

== As a male name ==
- Tamika Mkandawire, Malawian footballer

== See also ==
- Tameka
