= Murder of Alberto Adriano =

Murdered in 2000 in Dessau, Germany

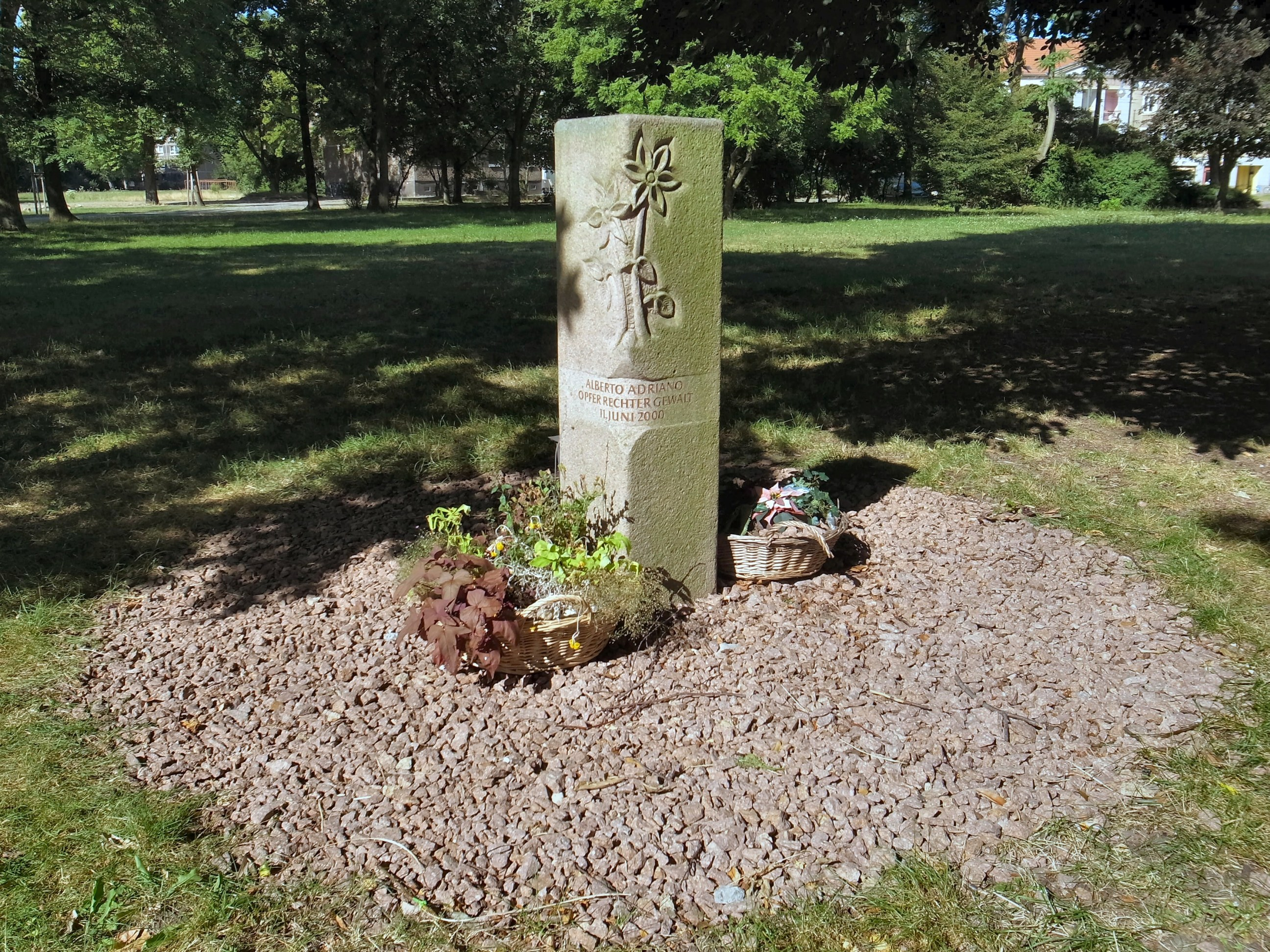
Memorial to Alberto Adriano

In 2000, Albert Adriano was murdered by three neo-Nazis in Dessau, Germany. The killers were immediately arrested and imprisoned after a trial.

== Life ==
Alberto Adriano was born c. 1961 in Mozambique. He travelled to East Germany in 1988 as a Vertragsarbeiter, working in a meat-processing plant and living in Dessau. He met his partner and together they had three children.

== Murder ==
On 10 June 2000, Adriano watched the opening game of the UEFA Euro 2000 football championship. He had told his friends that he was planning a trip to Mozambique. At around 1:30 am, he walked home 400 metres across Dessau city park. In the park he encountered three drunk neo-Nazis, who had missed their train home and were walking around shouting far-right slogans such as "Heil Hitler". They attacked Adriano and beat him to the ground, continuing to stamp on his head. He died from his injuries three days later. Three suspects, Enrico H., Frank M. and Christian R., were arrested the same night and confessed to the crime. Enrico H. was convicted of murder and the other two were imprisoned for nine years in juvenile detention.

== Legacy ==
The murder caused widespread revulsion in Germany and the Chancellor Gerhard Schröder attended Adriano's funeral. After the court case, Schroeder said it was "a suitable verdict for a heinous crime". Anti-Nazi initiatives were organised and Adriano's family was financially supported. Henning Mankell wrote a play based on the killing of Adriano which premiered at the Theater tri-bühne in Stuttgart in 2003.

== See also ==
- Death of Oury Jalloh
