= Tameka =

Tameka is a feminine given name. Notable people with the given name include:

- Tameka Yallop (born 1991), Australian football midfielder
- Tameka A. Clemons, American biochemist
- Tameka Cottle (born 1975), American singer-songwriter
- Tameka Empson (born 1977), British actress and comedian
- Tameka Foster (born 1971), American wardrobe stylist
- Tameka Jameson (born 1989), American-Nigerian sprinter
- Tameka Norris (born 1979), American artist
- Tameka Williams (born 1989), Saint Kitts and Nevis sprinter
