= Louie Rankin =

Jamaican musician and actor (1953–2019)

- Born: Leonard Ford c. 1953; Saint Thomas Parish, Jamaica, West Indies
- Died: September 30, 2019 (aged 65–66) Shelburne, Ontario
- Genres: Dancehall reggae
- Occupations: Musician; actor
- Years active: 1974–2019

Leonard Ford (b. 1953 – 30 September 2019), known professionally as Louie Rankin, was a Jamaican dancehall reggae artist and actor.

== Life and career ==
Leonard Ford was born in Saint Thomas Parish, Jamaica and grew up in Rockfort and East Kingston. His most successful song was the single "Typewriter", released in 1992. In his lyrics, Rankin often referred to himself as the "Original Don Dada," a term used by many of his dancehall competitors, such as Super Cat. Rankin also performed notable acting roles as a Jamaican "gangsta", in the movies Shottas and Belly. He lived in Toronto, Ontario, Canada, and was considered "the real Jamaican Don Dada". Rankin was a member of the Screen Actors Guild.

=== Death ===
He died on 30 September 2019, in a car crash on Highway 89 near Shelburne, Ontario. He lived in Hanover, Ontario at the time of his death.

== Filmography ==
Year	Title	Role	Notes
1998	Belly	Lennox	
2002	Shottas	Teddy Bruck Shut	
2014	We Run These Streets	Choppa	
2015	Q	Radigan	
