= A Beautiful Soul =

A Beautiful Soul may refer to:

- A Beautiful Soul (film), a 2012 drama film
- "A Beautiful Soul" (song), a 2014 song by Bret Michaels
