= Otto Schulmeister =

Austrian journalist (1916–2001)

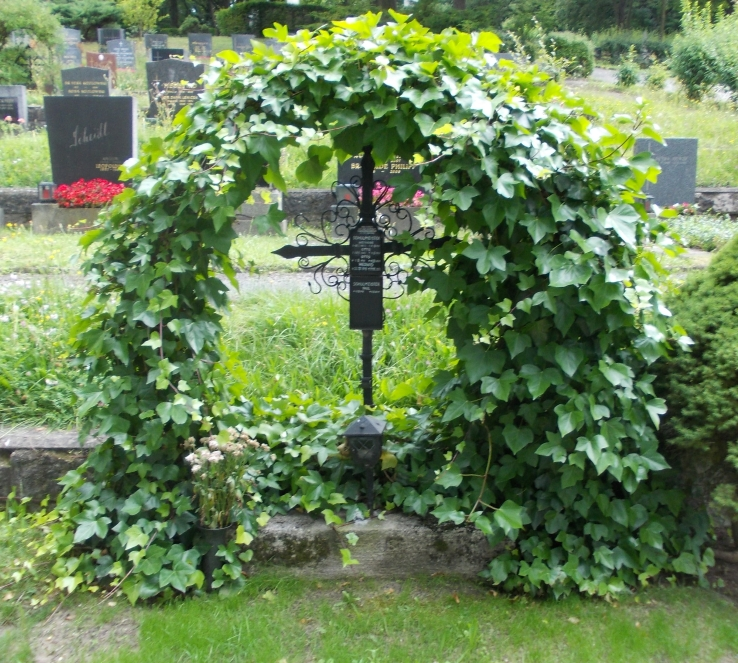
Grave of Otto Schulmeister at Neustift am Walde Cemetery

Otto Schulmeister (1 April 1916 in Vienna - 10 August 2001 in Vienna) was an Austrian journalist, who was described as the doyen of Austrian journalism. He was editor-in-chief of Die Presse from 1961 to 1976 and its publisher from 1976 to 1989. He was the father of former ORF correspondent Paul Schulmeister, and economist Stephan Schulmeister. Formerly a NSDAP member, it was revealed in 2009 that he worked for the CIA from the 1960s.

== Awards ==
- 1979: Preis der Stadt Wien für Publizistik
- 1989: Hanns Martin Schleyer Prize

== Works ==
- Die Zukunft Österreichs, 1967
- Die Welt, die wir verlassen, 1970
- Die erschöpfte Revolution, 1978
- Der zweite Anschluß, 1979
- Ernstfall Österreich, 1995

== Literature ==
- Theodor Venus (2007). "Schulmeister, Otto". Neue Deutsche Biographie (in German). Vol. 23. Berlin: Duncker & Humblot. pp. 685–686. (full text online).
