= Ky-Mani Marley =

Jamaican reggae musician (born 1976)

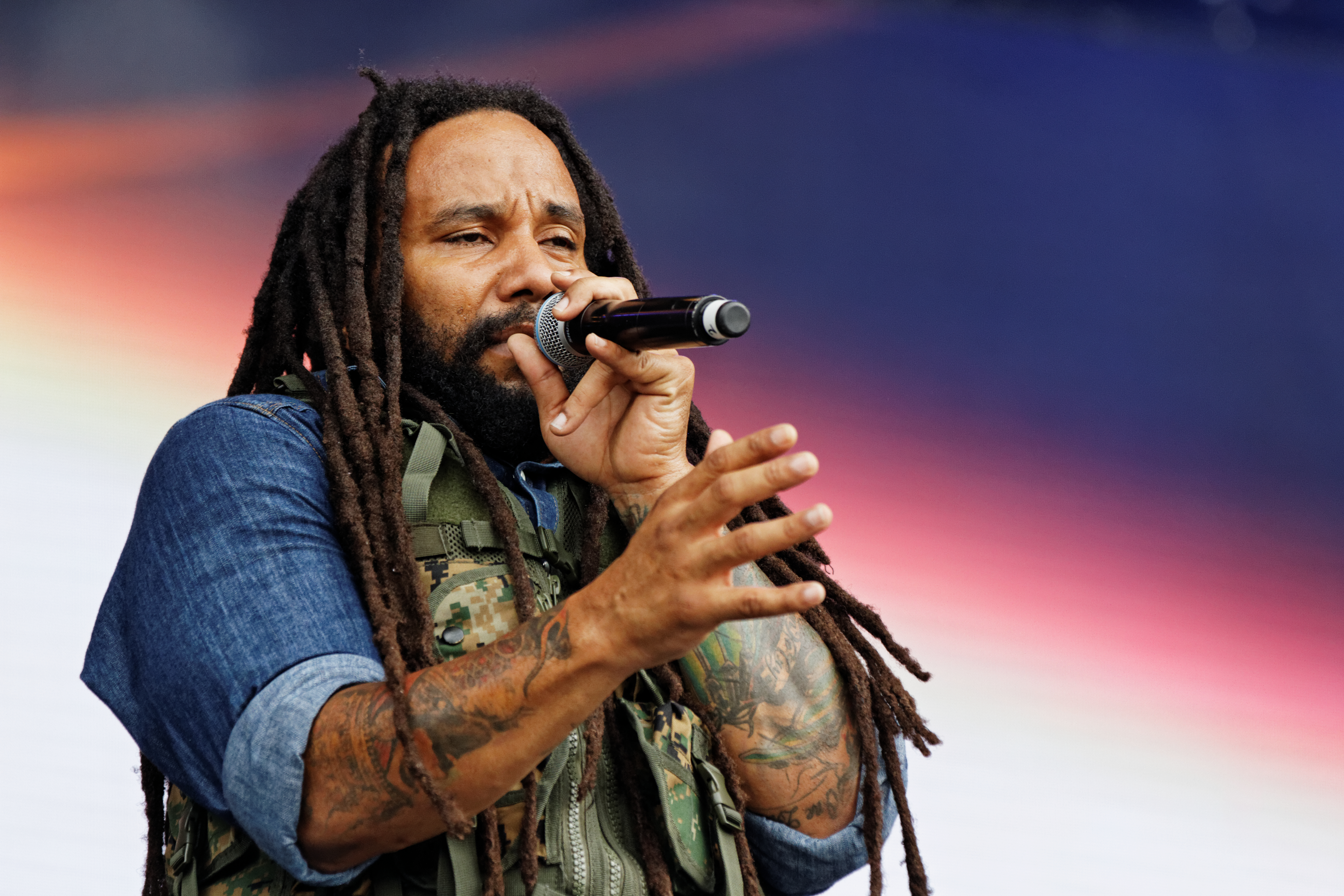
- Marley in 2014

Background information
- Born: Ky-Mani Ronald Marley; 26 February 1976 (age 50); Falmouth, Trelawny, Jamaica
- Genres: Reggae, dancehall, hip-hop, R&B
- Occupations: Musician, singer, songwriter
- Instruments: Guitar, vocals, piano, trumpet, bongos
- Years active: 1996–present
- Labels: Shang Records, Gee Street/V2 Records

Ky-Mani Ronald Marley (born 26 February 1976) is a Jamaican reggae musician. In 2001, he received a Grammy nomination for his album Many More Roads. He is the only child of the late reggae musician Bob Marley and Anita Belnavis, a Jamaican table tennis champion. He is one of Bob Marley's 11 children.

== Early life and family ==
Ky-Mani was born on 26 February 1976 out of wedlock outside of Bob’s marriage to singer Rita Marley in Falmouth, Jamaica, to Anita Belnavis and Bob Marley. When he was five years old, his father died of cancer. At the age of nine, Marley and his mother relocated to Miami, Florida. His taste in music was informed by the music he heard on American radio stations, especially hip-hop, rock, and pop. In his early youth, Marley was focused on sports. As an athlete, he competed in soccer and American football. With his mother's direction, he received piano and guitar lessons and played trumpet in his high school band.

== Career ==
While a teenager, Marley started rapping and deejaying. His first single was "Unnecessary Badness". He became inspired as a singer after being asked to sing a hook to a song during a recording session at a studio in Miami. Marley soon began experimenting with laying tracks, at times with his brothers Stephen, Julian, and Damian.

Marley signed to Shang Records where he recorded his debut album in 1996, Like Father Like Son, and several singles: "Judge Not" with Patra, followed by "Dear Dad" (which topped the British reggae charts), "Who the Cap Fit (remix)", and "Sensimelia", all of which added to his growing reputation in the new generation of reggae musicians. In 1997, Marley joined forces with Refugee Camp All-Stars and Pras of the Fugees, on "Avenues", a hit cover of Eddy Grant's "Electric Avenue". Marley appeared at international music showcase Midem when it was held in Miami for the first time. At the Cameo Theatre, Marley performed a set which was aired live by the Caribbean News Agency to 36 countries.

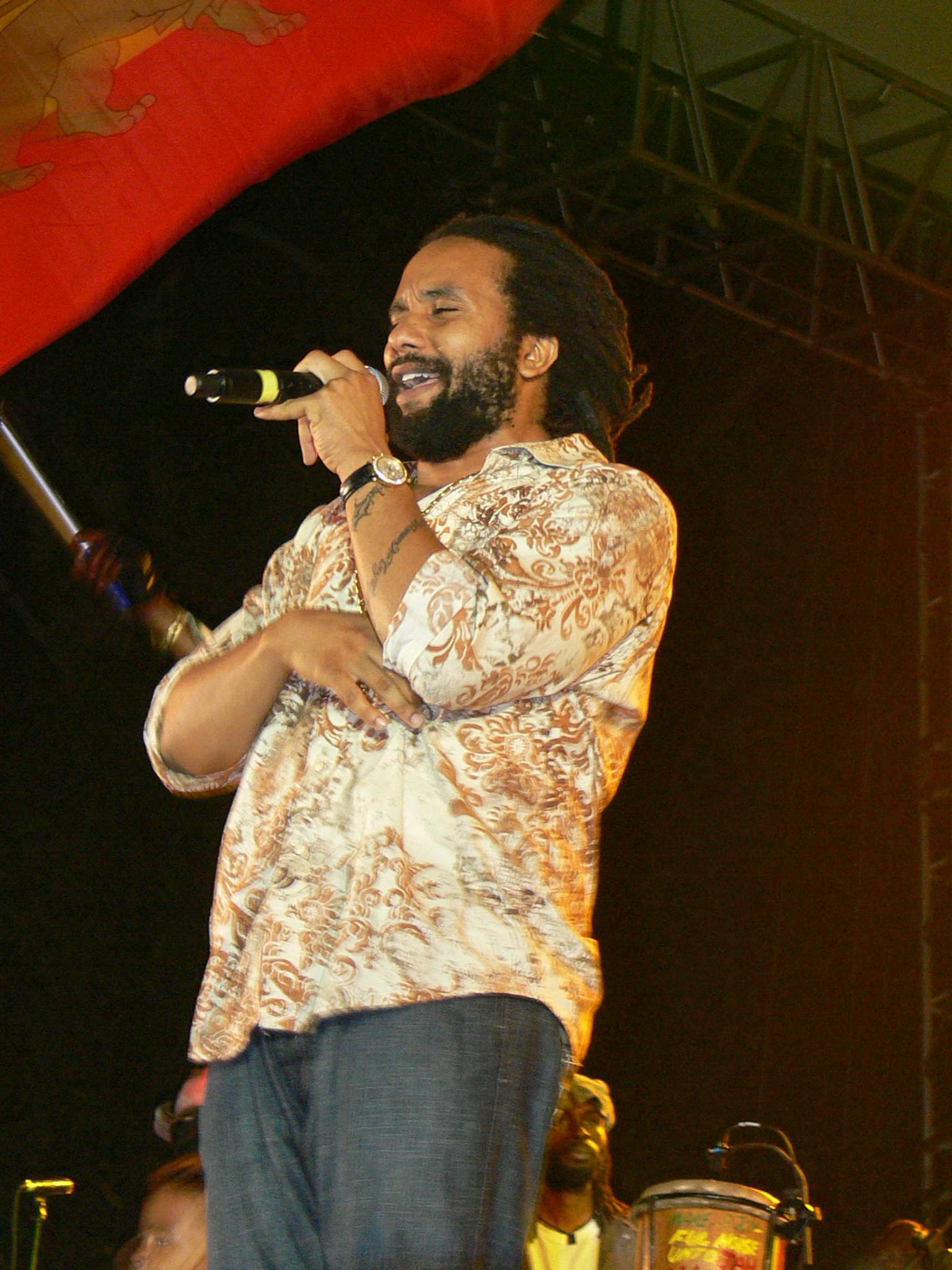
Marley in concert in 2008

Marley became the subject of a bidding war. He signed with Gee Street/V2 Records in 1997 where he completed a collaboration with label mate P.M. Dawn on the single "Gotta Be Movin' On Up".

Marley's next recording was the 2000 release, The Journey. In 2001, he released his third studio album Many More Roads, which was nominated for a Grammy Award, and went on tour. In 2004 he released his fourth studio album, Milestone. In 2007, he released Radio. Also in 2007, Marley joined Van Halen on tour as their opening act. In 2015, he released another album, Maestro.

In 2019, Marley collaborated with XXXTentacion, Stefflon Don, and Vybz Kartel on the single "Royalty". He also appeared in the music video, which was filmed after the death of XXXTentacion.

In 2024, Ky-Mani Marley received the Key to the Region Award from Tamarac City Commissioner Marlon D. Bolton for his music, social justice advocacy, and philanthropic contributions.

Marley's acting work included lead roles in the Jamaican films Shottas and One Love.

== Discography ==
- Like Father Like Son (1996)
- The Journey (2000)
- Many More Roads (2001)
- Milestone (2004)
- Radio (2007)
- "New Heights" (single) (2012)
- Maestro (2015)
- Conversations (2016) with Gentleman

=== Guest appearances ===
| Year | Song | Artist(s) | Album |
|---|---|---|---|
| 1997 | "Gotta Be...Movin' On Up" (featuring Ky-Mani Marley) | P.M. Dawn | "Gotta Be...Movin' On Up" (single) |
| 1997 | "Thank You Lord" (featuring Ky-Mani Marley) | Shaggy | Midnite Lover |
| 1997 | "Avenues" (featuring Pras and Ky-Mani Marley) | Refugee Camp All-Stars | Money Talks soundtrack |
| 2000 | "Equality" (featuring Ky-Mani Marley) | Afu-Ra | Body of the Life Force |
| 2007 | "Puff Puff Pass" (featuring Ky-Mani Marley) | Young Buck | Buck the World |
| 2008 | "Natural Mystic" (featuring Ky-Mani Marley) | Alborosie | Soul Pirate |
| 2011 | "Rasta Love" (featuring Ky-Mani Marley) | Protoje | 7 Year Itch |
| 2012 | "Your Love" (featuring Ky-Mani Marley) | The Dirty Heads | Cabin by the Sea |
| 2013 | "Zion Train" (featuring Ky-Mani Marley) | Alborosie | Sound the System |
| 2014 | "Smoke" (featuring Ky-Mani Marley) | Young Buck | Back to the Street 2 |
| 2014 | "Live Another Day" (featuring Ky-Mani Marley) | Quique Neira | Un amor |
| 2015 | "Bajito" (featuring Ky-Mani Marley) | Jencarlos Canela | _{Non-album single} |
| 2015 | "Bajito (Remix)" (featuring Ky-Mani Marley & Tito El Bambino) | Jencarlos Canela | _{Non-album single} |
| 2015 | "Chillax" (featuring Ky-Mani Marley) | Farruko | Visionary |
| 2019 | "Royalty" (featuring Ky-Mani Marley) | XXXTentacion | Bad Vibes Forever |
| 2019 | "Yayo" (feat. Pitbull and Ky-Mani Marley) | Papayo | _{TBA} |
| 2019 | "Celebration" (feat. Ky-Mani Marley) | Maffio, Farruko and Akon | _{TBA} |

== Filmography ==
- Shottas (2002)
- One Love (2003)
- Haven (2004)
- Eenie Meenie Miney Moe (2013)
- King of the Dancehall (2016)
