= Stephan Schulmeister =

Austrian jurist and economist

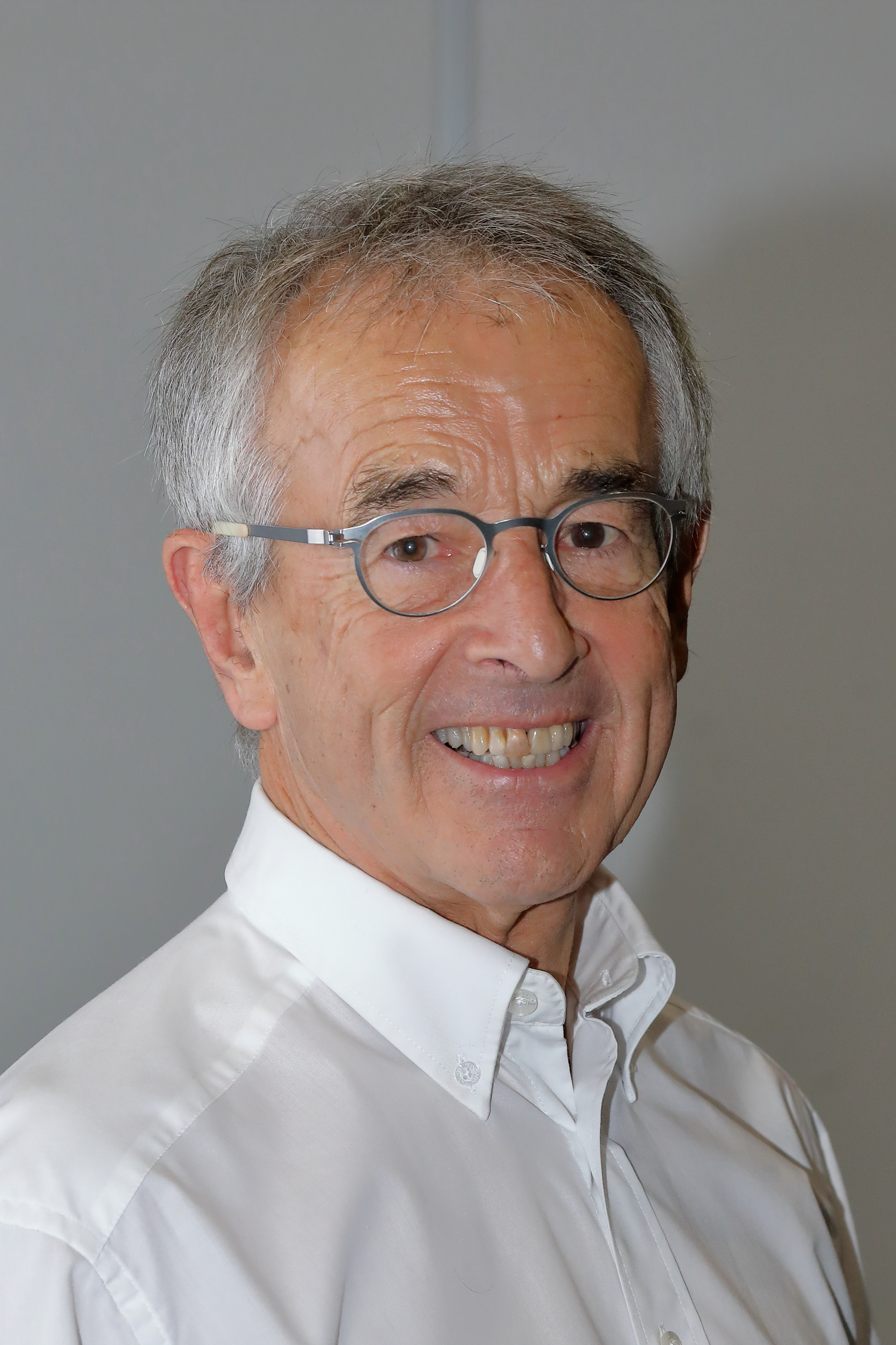
Stephan Schulmeister (2018)

Stephan Schulmeister (* 26 August 1947) is an Austrian jurist and economist, son of journalist Otto Schulmeister.

He worked at the Austrian Institute of Economic Research from 1972 to 2012, mainly in the fields of „midterm prognosis, long-term economic development, financial markets and international trade". His numerous publications, which tend to be critical of neoliberal policies, and his support for a pan-European New Deal made him one of the most well-known Austrian economists. His fields of study are Industrial Economics, Innovation and international competition, foreign economics and international economic trade, financial markets and business strategies.

Schulmeister has been a visiting scholar at various organizations outside Austria, such as New York University and the University of New Hampshire.
