= Gentleman (musician) =

German reggae musician (born 1974)

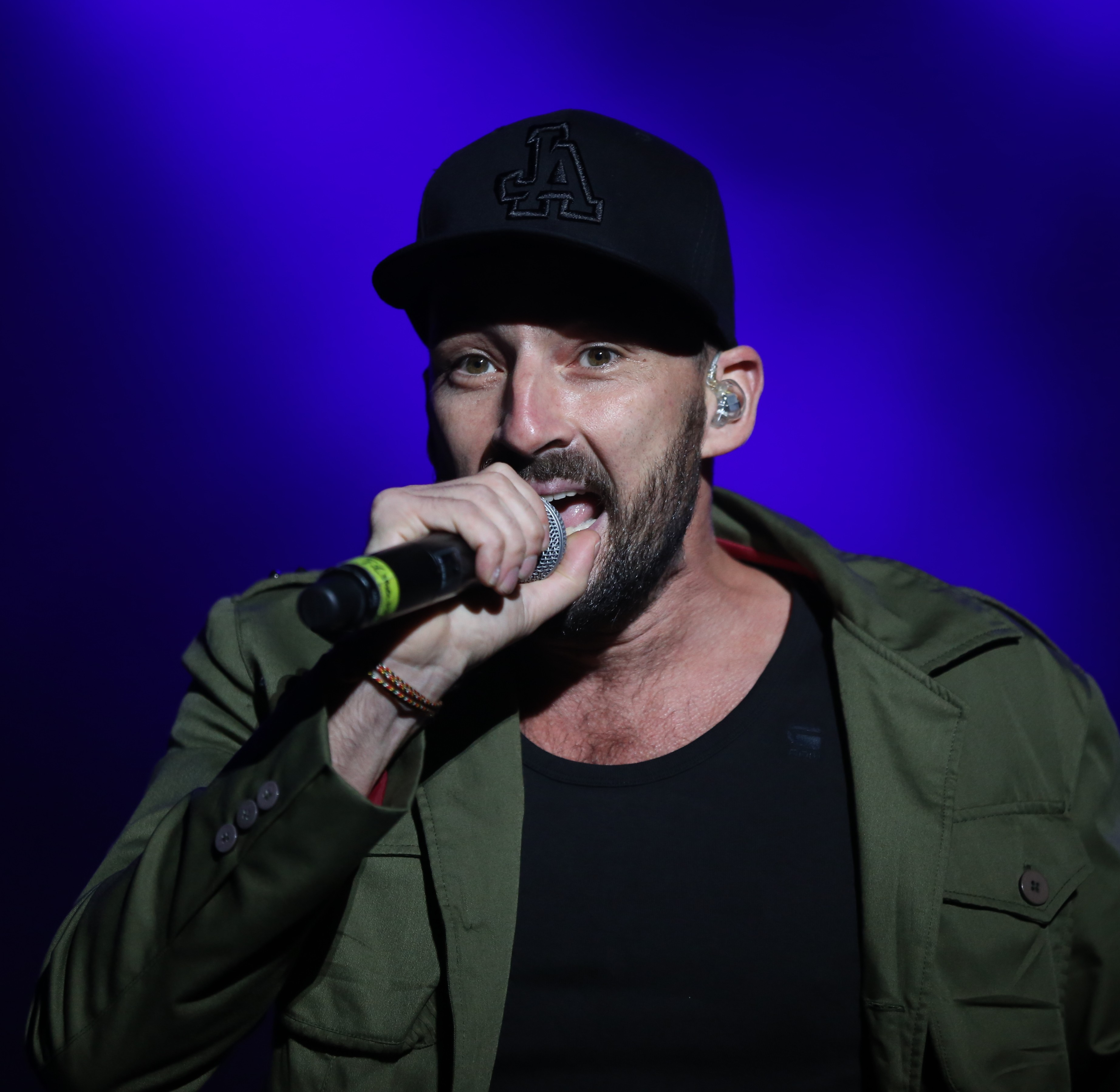
- Tilmann Otto a.k.a. Gentleman (2013)

Background information
- Born: Tilmann Otto; 19 April 1974 (age 52); Osnabrück, Germany
- Origin: Cologne, Germany
- Genres: Reggae, roots reggae, dancehall, reggae fusion
- Years active: 1998–present
- Label: Universal Music Group
- Website: gentleman-music.com

Tilmann Otto (born 19 April 1974), better known by his stage name Gentleman, is a German reggae musician.

== Personal life ==
Gentleman lives in the Neubrück area of Cologne. He is the son of a Lutheran pastor and is the father of two children named Samuel and Charly. He is married to Tamika, a singer who has supported him since his first concert tour of Germany in 2002. Although regularly on tour and in the studio, Gentleman generally considers himself a rather family oriented person, which becomes apparent in his music projects such as his long-player Journey to Jah, which was inspired by the birth of his first son Samuel. His song Mama from the collaborative album Conversations that he recorded with Ky-Mani Marley deals with his deep spiritual relationship to his mother.

== Music ==
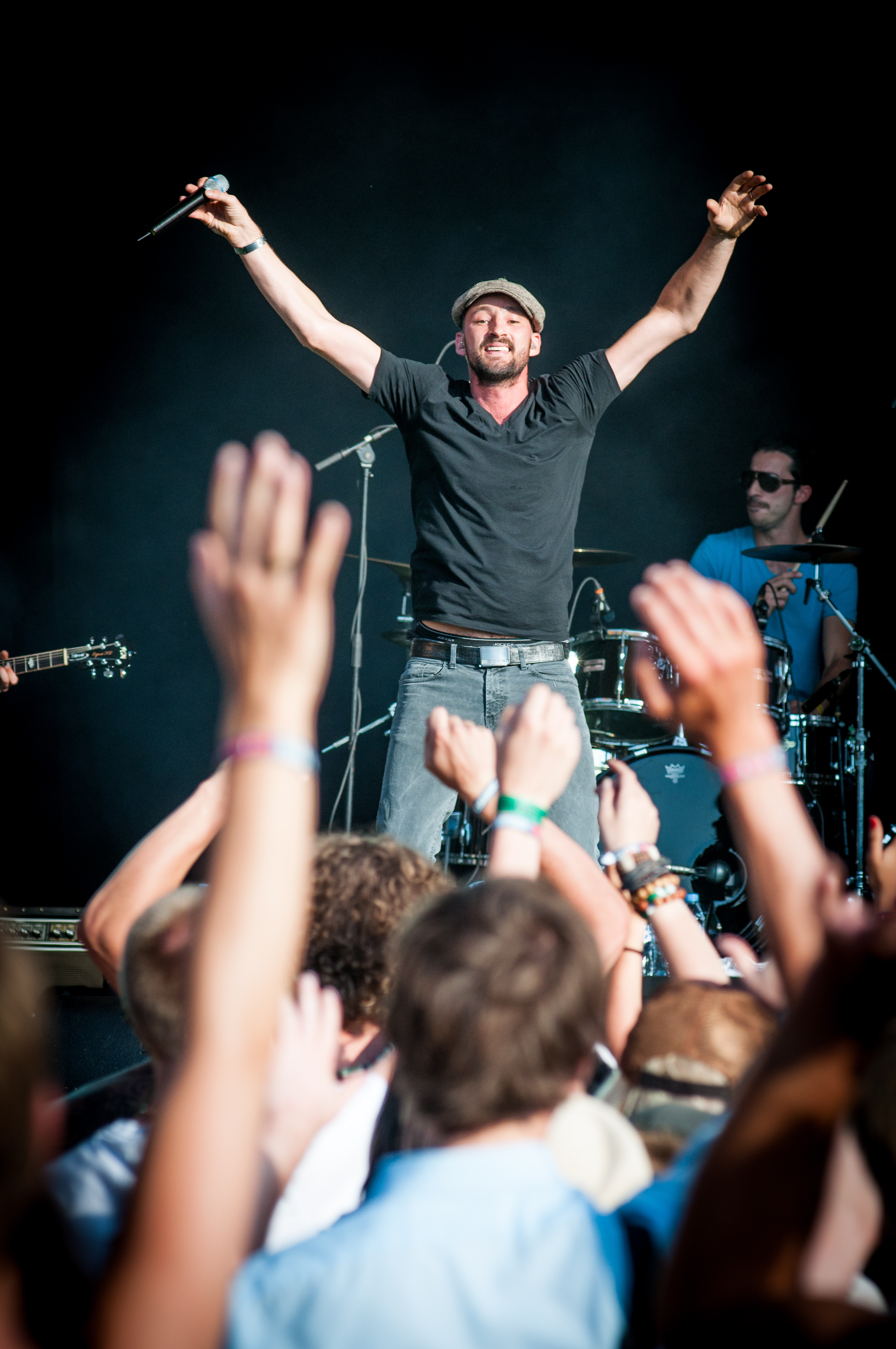
Gentleman at the 2011 Ilosaarirock festival

Gentleman has travelled to Jamaica regularly since he was 18 years old. His career began with the collaboration of the band Freundeskreis which produced the song "Tabula Rasa". After beginning his career as a deejay, he based his style to the classic form of the reggae genre like that of Bob Marley. He sings mainly in English or Jamaican Patois. With songs like "Send a Prayer", Gentleman expresses his deep belief in God. His album, Confidence, climbed to number 1 on the German album charts in 2004.

Gentleman was featured on the album True Love by Toots and the Maytals, which won the Grammy Award in 2004 for Best Reggae Album. In 2005, Gentleman performed with Mamadee with the song "Lass los" representing North Rhine-Westphalia in the Bundesvision Song Contest 2005, placing 15th with 10 points.

After ten years releasing music under the label Four Music he moved to Universal in 2010.

== Discography ==
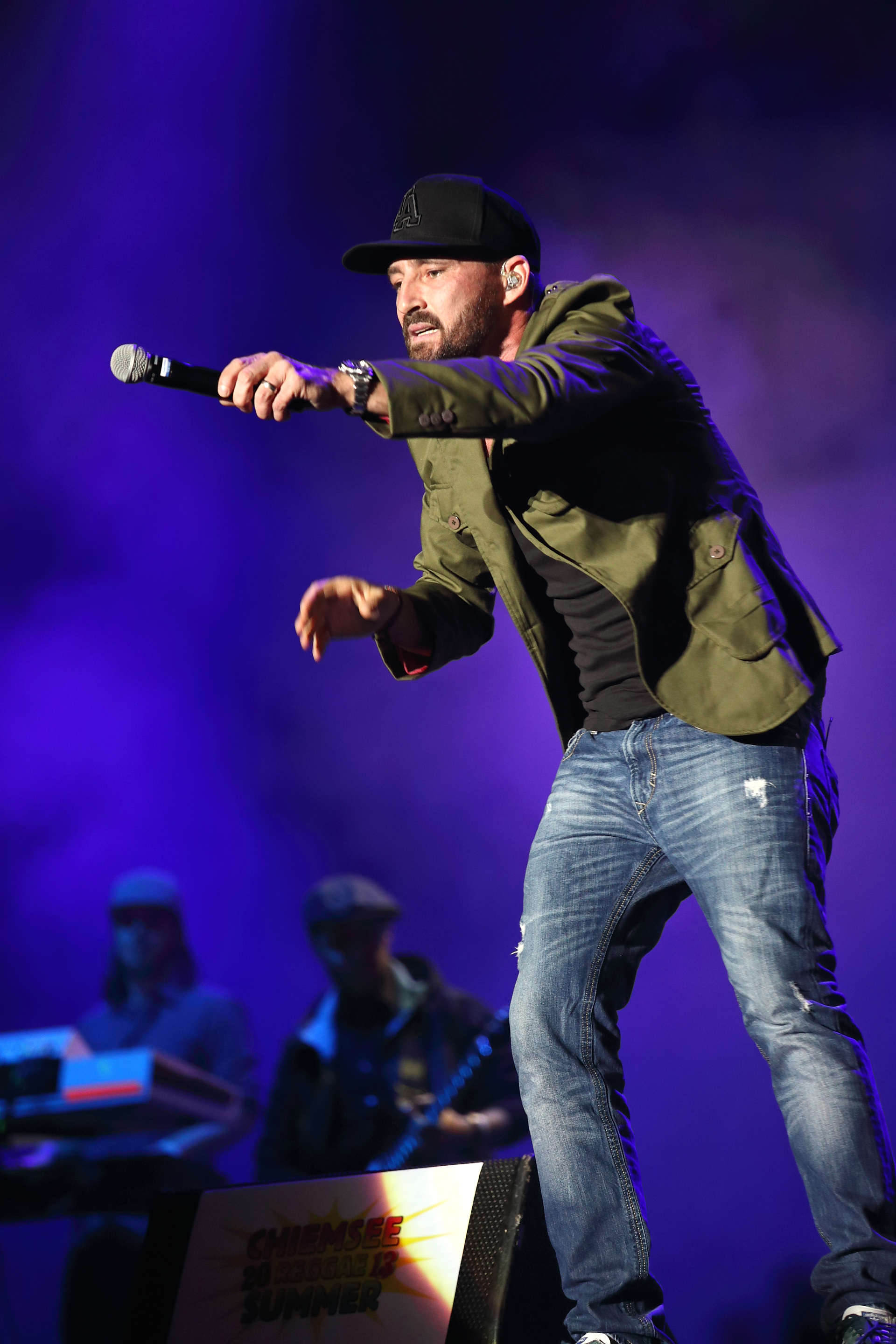
Gentleman at Chiemsee Reggae Summer 2013

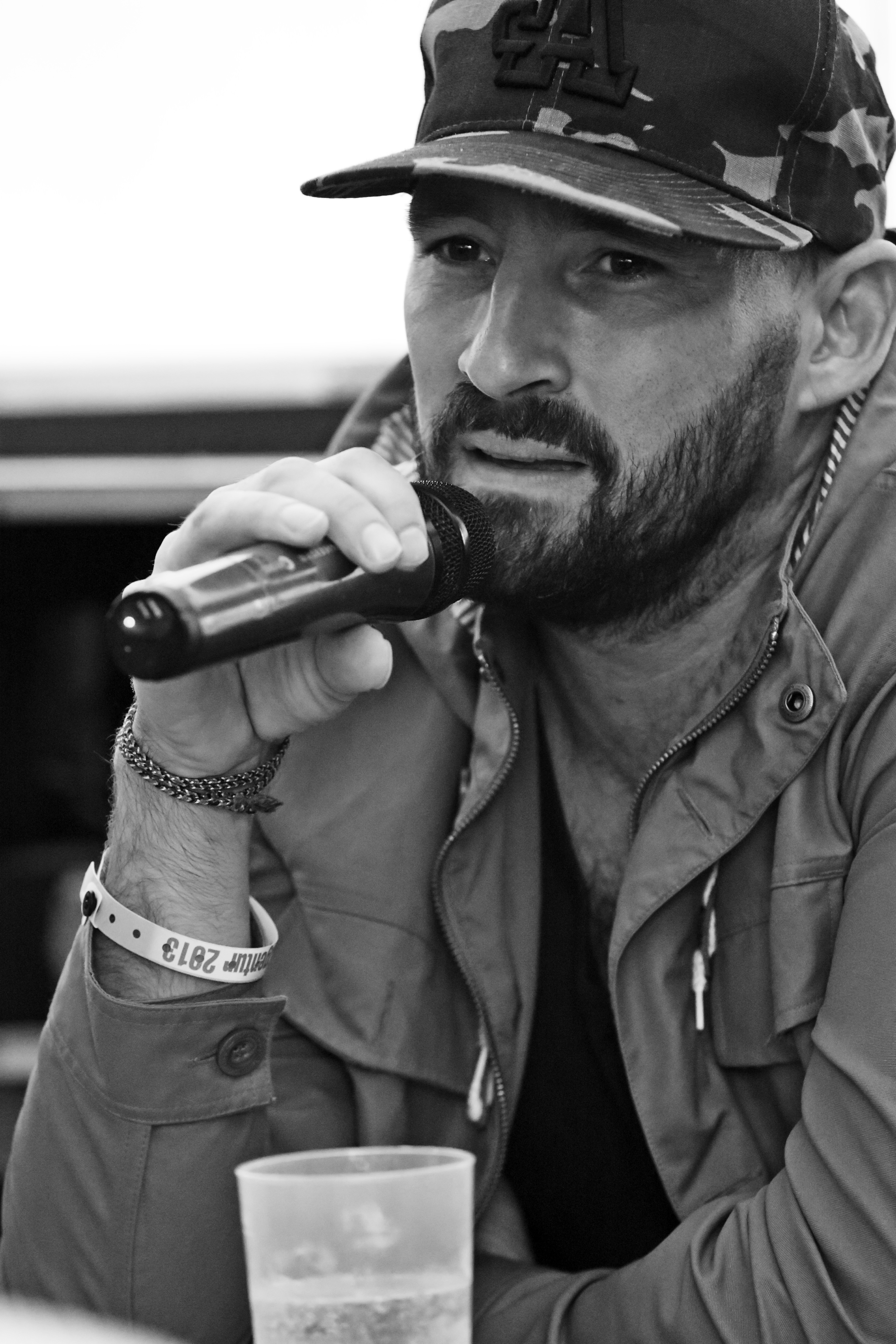
Gentleman (2013)

=== Albums ===
Year	Title	Chart positions					
Year	Title	GER	AUT	SWI	NED	FRA	POL
1999	Trodin On	59	–	–	–	–	–
2002	Journey to Jah	14	19	21	–	–	–
2003	Gentleman & The Far East Band Live	15	10	34	–	–	–
2004	Confidence	1	1	4	–	–	–
2007	Another Intensity	2	5	2	72	75	–
2010	Diversity	1	2	2	–	146	37
2011	Diversity Live	–	–	–	–	–	–
2012	Live Your Life (with Richie Stephens)	–	–	–	–	–	–
2013	New Day Dawn	6	10	8	–	–	–
2014	MTV Unplugged	8	14	14	–	–	–
2016	Conversations (with Ky-Mani Marley)	8	6	4	–	–	–
2017	The Selection	14	17	22	–	–	–
2020	Blaue Stunde	–	–	–	–	–	–
2022	Mad World	–	–	–	–	–	–
2026	Gratitude	–	–	–	–	–	–

=== Singles ===
Year	Title	Chart positions		
Year	Title	GER	AUT	SWI
1998	"Tabula Rasa" (feat. Freundeskreis & Mellowbag)	13	18	6
1998	"In the Heat of the Night"; Trodin On	–	–	–
1999	"Jah Jah Never Fail"; Trodin On	–	–	–
2002	"Leave Us Alone"; Journey to Jah	78	–	–
2002	"Dem Gone"; Journey to Jah	81	–	–
2003	"Runaway"; Journey to Jah	65	–	–
2003	"Rainy Days" (feat. Tamika & Martin Jondo); Gentleman & The Far East Band Live	88	–	–
2003	"Widerstand" (feat. Curse)	45	–	–
2004	"Superior"; Confidence	20	20	76
2005	"Isyankar" (feat. Mustafa Sandal)	6	11	4
2005	"Intoxication"; Confidence	33	58	–
2005	"Send a Prayer"; Confidence	75	–	–
2006	"On We Go" / "Caan Hold Us Down"; Confidence & Soundtrack Hui Buh	58	48	76
2007	"Different Places"; Another Intensity	42	65	–
2007	"Serenity"; Another Intensity	81	–	88
2007	"Zeit zu verstehen (This Can't Be Everything)" (Azad feat. Gentleman); Blockschrift	30	72	–
2008	"Soulfood" / "Lack of Love" (feat. Sizzla); Another Intensity	–	–	–
2009	"Changes"; Diversity	–	–	–
2010	"It No Pretty"; Diversity	19	24	33
2010	"Roots to Grow" (Stefanie Heinzmann feat. Gentleman); Roots to Grow	16	56	61
2010	"To the Top" (feat. Christopher Martin); Diversity	13	51	23
2013	"You Remember"; New Day Dawn	19	24	33
2013	"Heart of a Rub-a-Dub"; New Day Dawn (deluxe)	77	–	–
2016	"Ahnma" (Beginner feat. Gzuz and Gentleman)	8	55	65
2017	"Ovaload" (feat. Sean Paul)	78	–	–
2017	"Shake Away"	–	–	71
2017	"Roots" (RAF Camora feat. Gentleman)	42	36	52
2017	"iD" (Michael Patrick Kelly feat. Gentleman)	57	–	60
2018	"Like a Lion" (Mark Forster feat. Gentleman)	38	–	64
2020	"Devam" (featuring Luciano and Ezhel)	9	27	48
2020	"Schöner Tag" (with Sido)	27	49	38

=== EPs ===
- 1999: Heat of the Night
- 1999: Jah Jah Never Fail
- 2002: Leave Us Alone
- 2002: Dem Gone
- 2003: Rainy Days
- 2003: Runaway
- 2004: Superior
- 2005: Intoxication
- 2005: Send a Prayer
- 2006: On We Go / Caan Hold Us Down
- 2007: Different Places
- 2007: Serenity
- 2008: Soulfood / Lack of Love
- 2010: It No Pretty
- 2010: To the Top
- 2010: Lonely Days

=== DVDs ===
- 2003: Gentleman & The Far East Band Live
- 2011: Diversity Live
