= No Angels discography =

Discography of German girl group No Angels

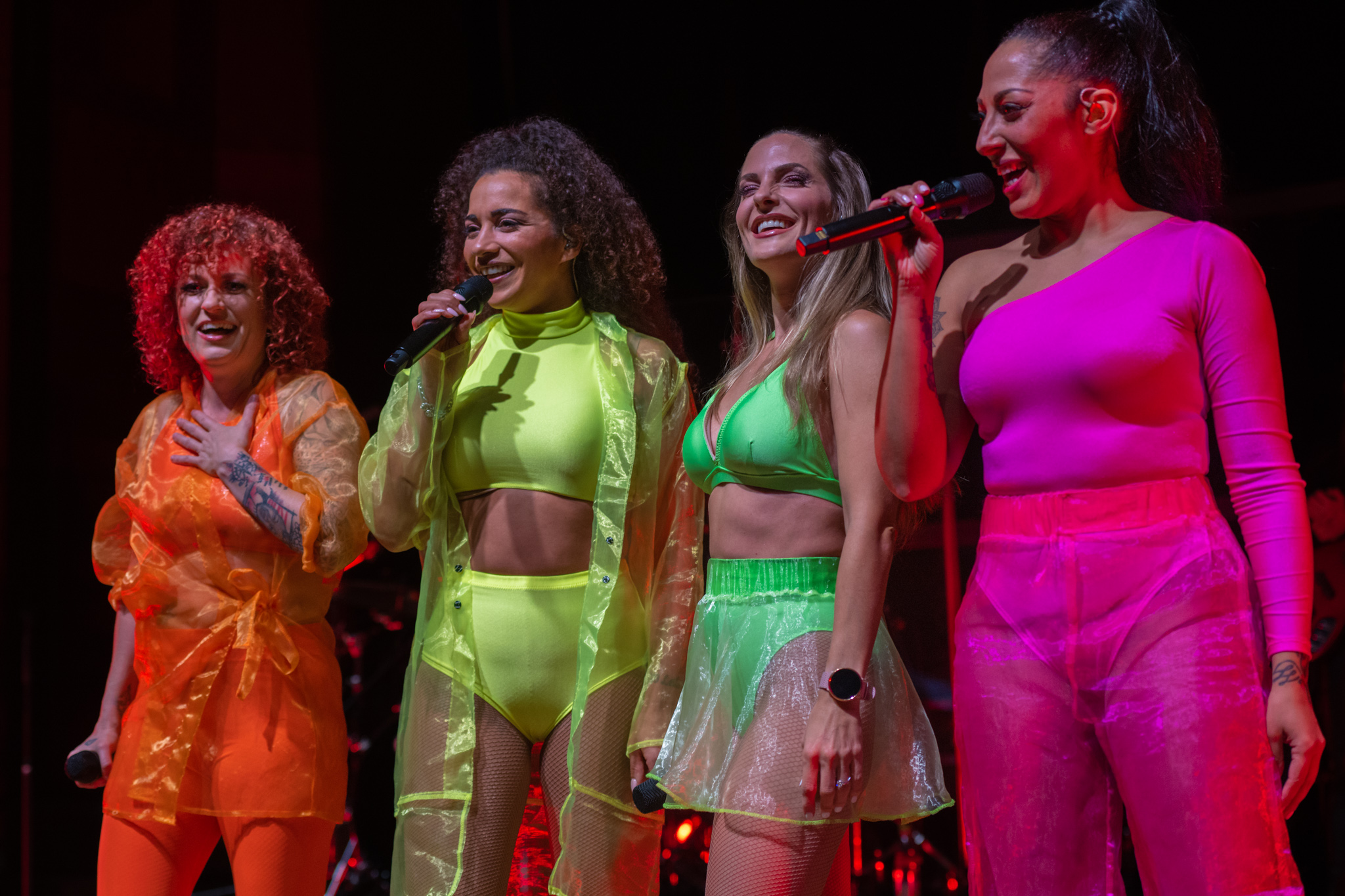
- Left to right: Lucy Diakovska, Nadja Benaissa, Sandy Mölling and Jessica Wahls performing in 2022
- Studio albums: 7
- Extended plays: 2
- Live albums: 2
- Compilation albums: 3
- Video albums: 4

The discography of German girl group No Angels consists of seven studio albums, three compilation albums, two live albums, four video albums, two extended plays and more than twenty singles. The group sold over five million records before breaking up in 2003, making them one of the highest-selling German girl groups of all time as well as one of the most successful acts in German music history.

In February 2001, the band released their debut single, "Daylight in Your Eyes", which reached number one in Germany for six consecutive weeks, and topped the charts in Austria and Switzerland. The group's debut album, Elle'ments, was released by Polydor in association with Zeitgeist and Cheyenne Records the following month and topped the German Albums Chart for three weeks, eventually being certified 7× gold. The album also reached number one in Austria and Switzerland, going platinum in both countries. The album spawned three more top ten singles, including a cover of Eurythmics' "There Must Be an Angel", another number one hit. The band's second album, Now... Us!, debuted and peaked at number one in Germany in June 2002. It produced four singles, two of which reached the top five in Germany, including their third number one single in Germany and Austria, "Something About Us". Preceded by their fourth number-one single, "No Angel (It's All in Your Mind)" and top five single "Someday", the group's third album, Pure, was released in August 2003. Their first album as a quartet, it was certified gold. The album spawned one more single, "Feelgood Lies", which reached number three in Germany. In September 2003, the group announced that they were splitting up and released one final album, The Best of No Angels, a greatest hits album with all of their singles, in December 2003. It peaked at number five in Germany for two weeks.

No Angels re-formed in 2007 and released their fourth studio album, Destiny, through Universal Records in April of the same year. Commercially less successful than their previous albums, it peaked at number four in Germany, becoming their first studio album not to reach the top spot. Although the singles from Destiny failed to match the success of its preceders, it produced two top five hits with the comeback single "Goodbye to Yesterday" and the German entry for the Eurovision Song Contest 2008, "Disappear". The band's second post-reunion album, Welcome to the Dance, was released in September 2009. It peaked at number twenty-six, lasting two weeks in the German albums chart, and became their lowest-charting and selling album up to then. Its first and only single "One Life" peaked at number fifteen in Germany. In September 2010, band member Nadja Benaissa left the band, leaving No Angels as a trio before they went into another hiatus. In early 2021, the band reformed once more as a quartet, commemorating with their 2001 debut. Their sixth studio album 20, a collection of re-recordings and new songs, was released by BMG Rights Management in June 2021 and became their four non-consecutive number-one album on the German Albums Chart. In 2024, No Angels recorded their first Christmas album It's Christmas, which was released on 21 November 2025 through Stars by Edel and marked their first release in four years. It opened at number ten on the German Albums Chart, becoming the band's eighth top ten album in Germany, and reached the top 30 in Austria.

== Albums ==
=== Studio albums ===
List of studio albums, with selected chart positions and certifications
| Title | Album details | Peak chart positions | | | | Certifications |
| Title | Album details | GER | AUT | SWI | EU | Certifications |
|---|---|---|---|---|---|---|
| Elle'ments | Released: 12 March 2001; Label: Polydor, Zeitgeist, Cheyenne; Formats: CD, cassette | 1 | 1 | 1 | 5 | AUT: Platinum; GER: 7× Gold; SWI: Platinum; EU: Platinum |
| Now... Us! | Released: 24 June 2002; Label: Polydor, Cheyenne; Formats: CD, cassette | 1 | 2 | 4 | 7 | AUT: Gold; GER: Platinum; SWI: Gold |
| Pure | Released: 25 August 2003; Label: Polydor, Cheyenne; Formats: CD, digital download | 1 | 2 | 9 | 10 | GER: Gold |
| Destiny | Released: 13 April 2007; Label: Polydor, Universal; Formats: CD, digital download | 4 | 14 | 22 | 14 | |
| Welcome to the Dance | Released: 11 September 2009; Label: Universal; Formats: CD, digital download | 26 | 65 | 95 | 31 | |
| 20 | Released: 4 June 2021; Label: BMG Rights; Formats: CD, digital download, LP | 1 | 2 | 6 | — | |
| It's Christmas | Released: 21 November 2025; Label: Stars by Edel; Formats: CD, digital download, LP | 10 | 26 | — | — | |

=== Live albums ===
List of live albums, with selected chart positions and certifications
| Title | Album details | Peak chart positions | | | | Certifications |
| Title | Album details | GER | AUT | SWI | EU | Certifications |
|---|---|---|---|---|---|---|
| When the Angels Swing | Released: 29 November 2002; Label: Poyldor, Cheyenne; Formats: CD | 9 | 22 | — | — | GER: Gold |
| Acoustic Angels | Released: 5 July 2004; Label: Poyldor, Cheyenne; Formats: CD, digital download | 80 | — | — | — | |
"—" denotes releases that did not chart or were not released.

=== Compilation albums ===
List of compilation albums, with selected chart positions
| Title | Album details | Peak chart positions | | | |
| Title | Album details | GER | AUT | SWI | EU |
|---|---|---|---|---|---|
| The Best of No Angels | Released: 1 December 2003; Label: Polydor, Cheyenne; Formats: CD, digital download | 5 | 17 | 58 | — |
| Colour Collection | Released: 1 October 2007; Label: Polydor, Universal; Formats: CD, digital download | — | — | — | — |
| Very Best of No Angels | Released: 27 May 2008; Label: Polydor, Universal; Formats: CD, digital download | — | — | — | — |
"—" denotes releases that did not chart or were not released.

=== Box sets ===
List of box sets with notes
| Title | Album details |
|---|---|
| The Collectors Box | Released: 30 June 2003; Label: Cheyenne/Polydor; Formats: CD, digital download |

== EPs ==
List of EPs, with selected details
| Title | EP details |
|---|---|
| Gold | Released: 11 April 2025; Label: BMG; Format: Digital download |
| The Remixes | Released: 25 July 2025; Label: BMG; Format: Digital download |

== Singles ==
List of singles, showing selected chart positions, certifications, and associated albums
| Title | Year | Peak chart positions | | | | Certifications | Album |
| Title | Year | GER | AUT | SWI | UK | Certifications | Album |
|---|---|---|---|---|---|---|---|
| "Daylight in Your Eyes" | 2001 | 1 | 1 | 1 | 89 | GER: Platinum; AUT: Platinum; SWI: Gold | Elle'ments |
| "Rivers of Joy" | 2001 | 7 | 11 | 10 | — | | Elle'ments |
| "There Must Be an Angel" | 2001 | 1 | 1 | 2 | — | GER: Gold; SWI: Gold | Elle'ments |
| "When the Angels Sing"/"Atlantis" (with Donovan) | 2001 | 5 | 5 | 16 | — | GER: Gold; AUT: Gold | Elle'ments |
| "Something About Us" | 2002 | 1 | 1 | 11 | — | GER: Gold; AUT: Gold | Now... Us! |
| "Still in Love with You" | 2002 | 2 | 4 | 10 | — | | Now... Us! |
| "Let's Go to Bed" (with Mousse T.) | 2002 | 12 | 46 | — | — | | Now... Us! |
| "All Cried Out" | 2002 | 18 | 23 | 56 | — | | Now... Us! |
| "No Angel (It's All in Your Mind)" | 2003 | 1 | 10 | 46 | — | | Pure |
| "Someday" | 2003 | 5 | 16 | 36 | — | | Pure |
| "Feelgood Lies" | 2003 | 3 | 12 | 29 | — | | Pure |
| "Reason" | 2003 | 9 | 12 | 28 | — | | The Best of No Angels |
| "Goodbye to Yesterday" | 2007 | 4 | 21 | 16 | — | | Destiny |
| "Maybe" | 2007 | 36 | 62 | — | — | | Destiny |
| "Amaze Me"/"Teardrops" | 2007 | 25 | — | — | — | | Destiny |
| "Disappear" | 2008 | 4 | 37 | 96 | — | | Destiny |
| "One Life" | 2009 | 15 | 29 | — | — | | Welcome to the Dance |
| "Daylight in Your Eyes (Celebration Version)" | 2021 | — (Note: "Daylight in Your Eyes (Celebration Version)" did not enter the German Singles Chart, but peaked at number 6 on the German Download Chart.) | — | — | — | | 20 |
| "Still in Love with You (Celebration Version)" | 2021 | — (Note: "Still in Love with You (Celebration Version)" did not enter the German Singles Chart, but peaked at number 34 on the German Download Chart.) | — | — | — | | 20 |
| "Mad Wild" | 2021 | — (Note: "Mad Wild" did not enter the German Singles Chart, but peaked at number 67 on the German Download Chart.) | — | — | — | | 20 |
| "When the Angels Sing (Winter Version)" | 2021 | — (Note: "When the Angels Sing (Winter Version)" did not enter the German Singles Chart, but peaked at number 93 on the German Download Chart.) | — | — | — | | 20 |
| "I Still Believe" | 2025 | — | — | — | — | | It's Christmas |
| "Santa Claus Is Comin' to Town" | 2025 | — | — | — | — | | It's Christmas |
| "Perfect Kind of Us" | 2026 | — | — | — | — | | Der perfekte Urlaub soundtrack |
"—" denotes releases that did not chart or were not released.

=== As featured artists ===
List of singles as featured artist, showing selected chart positions, certifications, and associated albums
| Title | Year | Peak chart positions | | | | Album |
| Title | Year | GER | AUT | SWI | UK | Album |
|---|---|---|---|---|---|---|
| "Do They Know It's Christmas?" (with TV All Stars) | 2003 | 3 | 28 | 32 | — | Ultimate Christmas Album |
"—" denotes releases that did not chart or were not released.

== Other appearances ==
List of album appearances
| Title | Year | Album |
|---|---|---|
| "Where Is Your Love" (DJ BoBo featuring No Angels) | 2002 | Celebration |
| "So Wanna Be with You" | 2003 | Popstars History |
| "Life Is a Miracle" | 2008 | Kleiner Dodo soundtrack |
| "A Little Better Everyday" | 2009 | limited digital release |

== Video albums ==
List of video albums with notes
| Title | Album details | Notes | Certification | Ref. |
|---|---|---|---|---|
| When the Angels Swing | Release date: 2 December 2002; Label: Polydor/Universal; Format: DVD | Contains a recording of the same-titled 2002 Berlin concert as well as interviews and behind-the-scenes footage. | GER: Gold | |
| The Best of No Angels | Release date: 1 December 2003; Label: Polydor/Universal; Format: DVD | Contains fifteen music videos that were produced for the group's singles released between the years of 2001 to 2003. | | |
| Acoustic Angels | Release date: 4 July 2004; Label: Polydor/Universal; Format: DVD | Contains a recording of the 2003 unplugged concert in Munich. | | |

== Music videos ==
List of music videos
| Title | Year | Director(s) | Ref. |
|---|---|---|---|
| "Daylight in Your Eyes" | 2001 | Robert Bröllochs | |
| "Daylight in Your Eyes" (US Version) | 2001 | Stephen Scott | |
| "Rivers of Joy" | 2001 | Robert Bröllochs | |
| "There Must Be an Angel" | 2001 | Jörn Heitmann | |
| "Atlantis" | 2001 | Ben Hartenstein | |
| "When the Angels Sing" | 2001 | Stefan Klotz | |
| "Something About Us" | 2002 | Marcus Sternberg | |
| "Still in Love with You" | 2002 | Marcus Sternberg | |
| "Let's Go to Bed" | 2002 | Marcus Sternberg | |
| "All Cried Out" (Big Band Version) | 2002 | Christopher Häring | |
| "All Cried Out" (Pop Version) | 2002 | Christopher Häring | |
| "No Angel (It's All in Your Mind)" | 2003 | Marcus Sternberg | |
| "Someday" | 2003 | Katja Kuhl | |
| "Feelgood Lies" | 2003 | Marcus Sternberg | |
| "Reason" | 2003 | Hans Hammers Jr. II | |
| "Do They Know It's Christmas?" | 2003 | Johannes Grebert | |
| "Goodbye to Yesterday" | 2007 | Marcus Sternberg | |
| "Maybe" | 2007 | Marcus Sternberg | |
| "Amaze Me" | 2007 | Marcus Sternberg | |
| "Teardrops" | 2007 | Marcus Sternberg | |
| "Life Is a Miracle" | 2008 | — | |
| "Disappear" | 2008 | Daniel Lwowski | |
| "One Life" | 2009 | Ole Ziesemann | |
| "Daylight in Your Eyes (Celebration Version)" | 2021 | Franz Leibinger | |
| "Still in Love with You (Celebration Version)" | 2021 | Franz Leibinger | |
| "I Still Believe" | 2025 | Marcel Brell | |
| "Santa Claus Is Comin' to Town" | 2025 | Marcel Brell | |
| "It's Christmas" | 2025 | Marcel Brell | |
