= The Best of No Angels =

Greatest hits album by No Angels
- Released: 1 December 2003
- Recorded: 2001–2003
- Length: 56:06
- Labels: Cheyenne; Polydor
- Producers: Pelle Ankarberg; Thorsten Brötzmann; Nik Hafemann; Jeo; Thomas Lundgren; Patrik Majer; Leslie Mándoki; Mousse T.; Nick Nice; Peter Plate; Ulf Leo Sommer; Peter Ries; Perky Park; Pontus Söderqvist; Twin

No Angels chronology
| Pure (2003) | The Best of No Angels (2003) | Acoustic Angels (2004) |

Singles from The Best of No Angels
- 1. "Reason" Released: 24 November 2003

The Best of No Angels is a compilation album by German girl group No Angels. It was released by Polydor–Zeitgeist and Cheyenne Records on 1 December 2003 in German-speaking Europe, coinciding with the group's first disbandment. A best-of album, it features all the singles from their first three studio albums Elle'ments (2001), Now... Us! (2002) and Pure (2003), as well as three additional album cuts from each album, including production from Thorsten Brötzmann, Leslie Mándoki, Mousse T., Perky Park, Peter Plate, Peter Ries, Ulf Leo Sommer, and Twin.

Following its release, Best of No Angels received positive reviews from music critics who praised the included material as the highlights of the group's music career. The compilation debuted and peaked at number five on the German Albums Chart and reached the top twenty in Austria. In addition to already existing material, the band recorded a slightly reworked version of their debut album closing track "That's the Reason" for the album. Re-titled "Reason", the ballad was released as the album's only single, also reaching the top ten in Germany

== Background ==
In late 2002, the No Angels management forced original band member Jessica Wahls to quit the band after giving birth to her first child. In summer 2003, the remaining four members, Nadja Benaissa, Lucy Diakovska, Sandy Mölling, and Vanessa Petruo, released their third regular studio album Pure. It became the band's third number-one album and reached Gold status in Germany, while also spawing the pop rock-influenced number-one leading single "No Angel (It's All in Your Mind)," their fourth non-consecutive chart topper. On 7 September 2003, a few days after the pre-sales start for their 2004 concert tour, the quartet announced that due to lasting exhaustion, they would not come together for a new No Angels project the following year and instead were preparing their official disbandment towards the end of 2003. While the media began a never-ending speculation about the reasons for their split, the girls and their management arranged the cancellation of all dates of their scheduled 2004 Pure Acoustic Tour, with the band agreeing on releasing a farewelll compilation album, The Best of No Angels.

== Promotion ==
Apart from a collection of all singles which the band had released between the years of 2001 and 2003, The Best of No Angels also contains a reworked version of "That's the Reason," the closing track from No Angels' debut album Elle'ments (2001). Re-titled "Reason," it would serve as the band's final single before their hiatus. Again produced by Thorsten Brötzmann and recorded by Trevor Hurst at FM-Studio in Frankfurt, the updated version contains a slightly alternated instrumentation as well as new lyrics that allude to its status as a farewell single. Involving a re-joined Jessica Wahls, "Reason" was released on 24 November 2003 and became another top ten success for the group, peaking at number nine on the German Singles Chart while also reached number 12 in Austria and number 28 in Switzerland. No Angels promoted the song at several television events.

== Release and reception ==
Professional ratings
Review scores
| Source | Rating |
|---|---|
| laut.de | 3/5 stars |

Stefan Johannesberg from laut.de found that The Best of No Angels "portrays the three-year rise from the RTL 2 gutter to a real divas combo with an experienced selection of songs [...] No matter how you feel about music, this advancement of No Angels deserves respect. As well as the decision to quit."

Released on 1 December 2003, The Best of No Angels debuted and peaked at number five on the German Albums Chart in the week ending 15 December 2003. This marked the band's fifth consecutive top ten album on the chart. Elsewhere, it entered the top twenty in Austria, peaking at number 17, and the top sity in Switzerland. In Germany, The Best of No Angels was ranked eighty-seventh on the 2003 year-end chart.

== Track listing ==
The Best of No Angels – Standard edition
| No. | Title | Writer(s) | Producer(s) | Length |
|---|---|---|---|---|
| 1. | "Something About Us" | Vanessa Petruo; Thorsten Brötzmann; Alexander Geringas | Brötzmann | 3:26 |
| 2. | "Rivers of Joy" | Niklas Pettersson; Hans Andersson | Peter Ries | 3:28 |
| 3. | "There Must Be An Angel" | Annie Lennox; David A. Stewart | Patrik Majer; Peter Plate; Ulf Leo Sommer | 3:55 |
| 4. | "When the Angels Sing" | Peter Ries; Charlemaine Thomas-Schmidtmer | Ries | 3:42 |
| 5. | "Atlantis 2002" (with Donovan) | Donovan Leitch; Leslie Mándoki; Laszlo Bencker | Mándoki | 4:01 |
| 6. | "Daylight in Your Eyes" | Tony Bruno; Tommy Byrnes | Brötzmann | 3:30 |
| 7. | "Let's Go to Bed" (with Mousse T.) | Mustafa Gündoğdu; Errol Rennalls | Mousse T. | 3:32 |
| 8. | "Still in Love with You" | Figge Boström; Johan Lindman | Nick Nice; Pontus Söderqvist | 3:31 |
| 9. | "All Cried Out" (Pop Version) | Steve Jolley; Alison Moyet; Tony Swain | Perky Park | 3:38 |
| 10. | "No Angel (It's All in Your Mind)" | Pete Kirtley; Tim Hawes; Liz Winstanley | Park; Nik Hafemann | 3:14 |
| 11. | "Someday" | Thomas Jansson; Niklas Hillbom | Brötzmann | 3:16 |
| 12. | "Feelgood Lies" | Niclas Molinder; Joacim Persson; Pelle Ankarberg; Charlie Dore; Maryann Morgan | Twin | 3:22 |
| 13. | "That's the Reason" | Brötzmann; Geringas | Brötzmann | 3:15 |
| 14. | "Faith Can Move a Mountain" | Julian Feifel | Mándoki | 3:28 |
| 15. | "Autumn Breeze" | Dennis Dowlut | Nice; Söderqvist | 3:32 |
| 16. | "Eleven Out of Ten" | Molinder; Persson; Ankarberg; Dore | Lundgren | 3:37 |

The Best of No Angels – Special limited edition – Acoustic Angels (CD2)
| No. | Title | Writer(s) | Length |
|---|---|---|---|
| 1. | "Daylight in Your Eyes" | Bruno; Tommy Byrnes | 4:49 |
| 2. | "All Cried Out" | Jolley; Moyet; Swain | 3:11 |
| 3. | "Rivers of Joy" | Pettersson; Andersson | 4:51 |
| 4. | "Faith Can Move a Mountain" | Julian Feifel | 4:17 |
| 5. | "Someday" | Jansson; Hillbom | 3:24 |
| 6. | "No Angel (It's All in Your Mind)" | Kirtley; Hawes; Winstanley | 3:58 |
| 7. | "Still in Love with You" | Boström; Lindman | 4:47 |
| 8. | "Something About Us" | Petruo; Brötzmann; Geringas | 4:06 |
| 9. | "Washes Over Me" | Ries | 5:08 |

== Charts ==
=== Weekly charts ===
Weekly chart performance for The Best of No Angels
| Chart (2003) | Peak position |
|---|---|
| Austrian Albums (Ö3 Austria) | 17 |
| German Albums (Offizielle Top 100) | 5 |
| Swiss Albums (Schweizer Hitparade) | 58 |

=== Year-end charts ===
Year-end chart performance for The Best of No Angels
| Chart (2004) | Position |
|---|---|
| German Albums (Offizielle Top 100) | 87 |

== Release history ==
The Best of No Angels release history
| Region | Date | Edition | Format | Label | Ref. |
|---|---|---|---|---|---|
| Austria | 1 December 2003 | Standard; Special limited | CD; DVD; digital download | Cheyenne; Polydor | |
| Germany | 1 December 2003 | Standard; Special limited | CD; DVD; digital download | Cheyenne; Polydor | |
| Switzerland | 1 December 2003 | Standard; Special limited | CD; DVD; digital download | Cheyenne; Polydor | |
