= Acoustic Angels =

Live album by No Angels
- Released: 5 July 2004
- Recorded: 2003, P1 club (Munich, Germany)
- Length: 41:11
- Label: Cheyenne; Polydor

No Angels chronology
The Best of (2003)	Acoustic Angels (2004)	Destiny (2007)

Acoustic Angels is a live album by German girl group No Angels. It was recorded as part of a special unplugged performance at the P1 club in Munich, Germany, and originally released on a special edition of band's third studio album Pure (2003) by Cheyenne Records. Following the group's disbandment in fall 2003, it received a sole release on 5 July 2004 in German-speaking Europe, where it reached number 80 on the German Albums Chart only.

== Critical reception ==
Professional ratings
Review scores
Source	Rating
Laut.de	1/5 stars

Laut.de critic Joachim Gauger dismissed the DVD release of the album for its lack of extras but complimented the performance of the band on Acoustic Angels, writing that "the four girls present themselves in an extremely good mood, at least vocally. Accompanied only by acoustic guitar, drums and bass, they present a colorful program with pieces from the albums Elle'ments and Now... Us! as well as Pure, which was still unreleased at the time of the concert."

== Track listing ==
Acoustic Angels track listing
No.	Title	Writer(s)	Length
1.	"Daylight in Your Eyes"	Tony Bruno; Tommy Byrnes	4:49
2.	"All Cried Out"	Steve Jolley; Alison Moyet; Tony Swain	3:11
3.	"Rivers of Joy"	Niklas Pettersson; Hans Andersson	4:51
4.	"There Must Be an Angel"	Annie Lennox; David A. Stewart	3:55
5.	"Faith Can Move a Mountain"	Julian Feifel	4:17
6.	"Someday"	Thomas Jansson; Niklas Hillbom	3:24
7.	"No Angel (It's All in Your Mind)"	Pete Kirtley; Tim Hawes; Liz Winstanley	3:58
8.	"Still in Love with You"	Figge Boström; Johan Lindman	4:47
9.	"Something About Us"	Vanessa Petruo; Thorsten Brötzmann; Alexander Geringas	4:06
10.	"Washes Over Me"	Peter Ries	5:08
Total length:			41:11

== Charts ==
Chart performance for Acoustic Angels
Chart (2004)	Peak position
German Albums (Offizielle Top 100)	80
