= List of number-one hits of 2003 (Germany) =

This is a list of the German Media Control Top100 Singles Chart number ones of 2003.

== Number-one hits by week ==
Key
†	Indicates best-performing single and album of 2003

Issue date	Song	Artist	Ref.	Album	Artist	Ref.
6 January	"Der Steuersong"	Die Gerd-Show		Mensch	Herbert Grönemeyer	
13 January	"We Have a Dream" †	Deutschland sucht den Superstar		Escapology	Robbie Williams	
20 January	"We Have a Dream" †	Deutschland sucht den Superstar		Escapology	Robbie Williams	
27 January	"We Have a Dream" †	Deutschland sucht den Superstar		8 Mile: Music from and Inspired by the Motion Picture	Various artists	
3 February	"We Have a Dream" †	Deutschland sucht den Superstar		8 Mile: Music from and Inspired by the Motion Picture	Various artists	
10 February	"We Have a Dream" †	Deutschland sucht den Superstar		8 Mile: Music from and Inspired by the Motion Picture	Various artists	
17 February	"We Have a Dream" †	Deutschland sucht den Superstar		Walking on a Thin Line	Guano Apes	
24 February	"All the Things She Said"	t.A.T.u.		United†	Deutschland sucht den Superstar	
3 March	"All the Things She Said"	t.A.T.u.		United†	Deutschland sucht den Superstar	
10 March	"All the Things She Said"	t.A.T.u.		United†	Deutschland sucht den Superstar	
17 March	"All the Things She Said"	t.A.T.u.		United†	Deutschland sucht den Superstar	
24 March	"All the Things She Said"	t.A.T.u.		United†	Deutschland sucht den Superstar	
31 March	"Take Me Tonight"	Alexander		United†	Deutschland sucht den Superstar	
7 April	"Take Me Tonight"	Alexander		Meteora	Linkin Park	
14 April	"You Drive Me Crazy"	Daniel K		Meteora	Linkin Park	
21 April	"Take Me Tonight"	Alexander		Casting Shadows	Wolfsheim	
28 April	"You Drive Me Crazy"	Daniel K		Love Metal	HIM	
5 May	"No Angel (It's All in Your Mind)"	No Angels		American Life	Madonna	
12 May	"In da Club"	50 Cent		Take Your Chance	Alexander	
19 May	"Für dich"	Yvonne Catterfeld		American Life	Madonna	
26 May	"Für dich"	Yvonne Catterfeld		The Golden Age of Grotesque	Marilyn Manson	
2 June	"Für dich"	Yvonne Catterfeld		Machtlos	Andrea Berg	
9 June	"Für dich"	Yvonne Catterfeld		Meine Welt	Yvonne Catterfeld	
16 June	"Für dich"	Yvonne Catterfeld		St. Anger	Metallica	
23 June	"Für dich"	Yvonne Catterfeld		St. Anger	Metallica	
30 June	"Ich kenne nichts (das so schön ist wie du)"	RZA featuring Xavier Naidoo		St. Anger	Metallica	
7 July	"Aicha"	Outlandish		St. Anger	Metallica	
14 July	"Aicha"	Outlandish		St. Anger	Metallica	
21 July	"Aicha"	Outlandish		St. Anger	Metallica	
28 July	"Aicha"	Outlandish		Dangerously In Love	Beyoncé	
4 August	"Aicha"	Outlandish		Dangerously In Love	Beyoncé	
11 August	"In the Shadows"	The Rasmus		Dangerously In Love	Beyoncé	
18 August	"Ich denk an dich"	Pur		Tour de France Soundtracks	Kraftwerk	
25 August	"Burger Dance"	DJ Ötzi featuring Eric Dikeb		Dead Letters	The Rasmus	
1 September	"Never Leave You (Uh Oooh, Uh Oooh)"	Lumidee featuring Busta Rhymes and Fabolous		Up!	Shania Twain	
8 September	"Angel of Berlin"	Martin Kesici		Pure	No Angels	
15 September	"Never Leave You (Uh Oooh, Uh Oooh)"	Lumidee featuring Busta Rhymes and Fabolous		Blast Action Heroes	Beginner	
22 September	"Angel of Berlin"	Martin Kesici		Was ist passiert?	Pur	
29 September	"Unrockbar"	Die Ärzte		Was ist passiert?	Pur	
6 October	"White Flag"	Dido		Results May Vary	Limp Bizkit	
13 October	"Where Is the Love?"	The Black Eyed Peas		Geräusch	Die Ärzte	
20 October	"Where Is the Love?"	The Black Eyed Peas		Life for Rent	Dido	
27 October	"Where Is the Love?"	The Black Eyed Peas		Life for Rent	Dido	
3 November	"Where Is the Love?"	The Black Eyed Peas		Life for Rent	Dido	
10 November	"Free Like the Wind"	Alexander		In Time: The Best of R.E.M. 1988–2003	R.E.M.	
17 November	"Free Like the Wind"	Alexander		Life for Rent	Dido	
24 November	"Schick mir 'nen Engel"	Overground		Mensch - Live	Herbert Grönemeyer	
1 December	"Everyday Girl"	Preluders		It's Done	Overground	
8 December	"Schick mir 'nen Engel"	Overground		Live Summer 2003	Robbie Williams	
15 December	"Music Is the Key"	Sarah Connor and Naturally 7		Live Summer 2003	Robbie Williams	
22 December	"Shut Up"	The Black Eyed Peas		Live Summer 2003	Robbie Williams	
29 December	No release (Note: Same issue as for 22 December.)					

== See also ==
- List of number-one hits (Germany)
