= Reason (No Angels song) =

Single by No Angels

from the album The Best of No Angels
- Released: 24 November 2003
- Studio: Park Studios (Tutzing, Germany)
- Length: 3:36
- Label: Cheyenne; Polydor
- Songwriters: Thorsten Brötzmann; Alexander Geringas
- Producer: Thorsten Brötzmann

No Angels singles chronology
"Feelgood Lies" (2003)	"Reason" (2003)	"Goodbye to Yesterday" (2007)

"Reason" is a song by German girl band No Angels. It was written by Thorsten Brötzmann and Alexander Geringas and produced by the former for their debut studio album Elle'ments (2001). "Reason" is a piano-led pop ballad with soft string arrangements and lyrics that talk about reminiscing past memories with a loved one. One of the slower songs on the album, its original version, entitled "That's the Reason", served as the closing track on both the original version of Elle'ments as well as its Special Winter deluxe edition.

An updated version of the song, featuring new vocals, new instrumentation and slightly different lyrics was recorded following the band's announcement of their temporary disbandment in September 2003. Throughout the process, the remaining band members were rejoined by Jessica Wahls who had left the band the year before. "Reason" served as the band's farewell single and lead single from their compilation album The Best of No Angels (2003) and was released on 24 November 2003 in German-speaking Europe. Another top ten success, the song peaked at number nine on the German Singles Chart and reached number 12 in Austria and number 28 in Switzerland.

== Background ==
The original version of the song, entitled "That's the Reason", was originally written by German musicians Thorsten Brötzmann and Alexander Geringas, and produced by the former for No Angels' debut studio album Elle'ments (2001), on which the piano-laid pop ballad served as its closing track. Two years after its release, on 7 September 2003, the band announced that they would not come together for a new No Angels project in 2004 due to lasting exhaustion. In addition, No Angels announced the release of a best of album, The Best of No Angels, for December 2003, involving original band member Jessica Wahls, who had left the group after her pregnancy in 2002.

Apart from a collection of all singles, the group had released between the years of 2001 and 2003, the compilation album also contained a reworked version of "That's the Reason", re-titled "Reason", which served as the band's final single before their hiatus. Again produced by Brötzmann and recorded by Trevor Hurst at FM-Studio in Frankfurt, the updated version contains new lyrics and a slightly alternated instrumentation. Vocal arrangement was overseen by Christoph Leis-Bendorff, while vocal production was helmed by Nik Hafemann. Mixing of "Reason" was handled by Jeo, who also played keyboards along with Brötzmann, Werner Becker, and Stefan Hansen.

== Release and reception ==
Selected as the group's final single before their hiatus, physical singles of "Reason" were released on 24 November 2003 by Cheyenne Records. The maxi single includes several remixes of the song, including an orchester version as well as a karaoke version of the song, as well as original version "That's the Reason." Upon its release, "Reason" debuted at number nine on the German Singles Chart in the week of 8 December 2003, becoming the group's tenth top ten entry. It fell out of the top twenty in its seventh week and left the chart after eleven weeks, In Austria, the single debuted number 22 on the Ö3 Austria Top 40. It reached its peak at number 12 in its fourth week and spent eight more weeks within the top 75. In Switzerland, "Reason" debuted and peaked at number 28 on the Swiss Hitparade in the week of 7 December. It spent 13 weeks on the chart and became the band's highest-charting single since "Still in Love with You" (2002) in that territory.

== Track listings ==
Maxi single
No.	Title	Writer(s)	Producer(s)	Length
1.	"Reason" (Radio Version)	Thorsten Brötzmann; Alexander Geringas	Brötzmann	3:36
2.	"Reason" (Orchester Version)	Brötzmann; Geringas	Brötzmann	3:36
3.	"Reason" (Karaoke Version)	Brötzmann; Geringas	Brötzmann	3:36
4.	"That's the Reason"	Brötzmann; Geringas	Brötzmann	3:16

2-track CD single
No.	Title	Writer(s)	Producer(s)	Length
1.	"Reason" (Radio Version)	Brötzmann; Geringas	Brötzmann	3:36
2.	"Reason" (Orchester Version)	Brötzmann; Geringas	Brötzmann	3:36

== Credits and personnel ==
Credits adapted from the liner notes of The Best of No Angels.

- Nadja Benaissa – vocals
- Werner Becker – keyboards
- Thorsten Brötzmann – production, keyboards
- Lucy Diakovska – vocals
- Trevor Hafemann – vocal production, supervising production
- Stefan Hansen – keyboards
- Trevor Hurst – vocal recording
- Jeo – mixing, keyboards
- Christoph Leis-Bendorff – vocal arrangement
- Sandy Mölling – vocals
- Vanessa Petruo – vocal
- Jessica Wahls – vocals

== Charts ==
Weekly chart performance for "Reason"
Chart (2003)	Peak position
Austria (Ö3 Austria Top 40)	12
Czech Republic Airplay (ČNS IFPI)	79
Germany (GfK)	9
Switzerland (Schweizer Hitparade)	28

== Release history ==
Release dates and formats for "Reason"
Region	Date	Format	Label	Ref
Various	24 November 2003	CD single; digital download	Cheyenne; Polydor	
