= The Other Side (Lucy Diakovska album) =

Studio album by Lucy Licious
- Released: 5 September 2005
- Recorded: 2004–2005
- Genre: Pop; pop rock
- Label: Schmanky; Edel
- Producer: Lucy Diakovska; Stephan Ullmann

Singles from The Other Side
- 1. "The Other Side" Released: 15 August 2005; 2. "Misunderstood" Released: 9 December 2005

The Other Side is the debut studio album by Bulgarian-born German recording artist Lucy Diakovska, released by Edel Records and Schmanky Records under her pseudonym Lucy Licious on 5 September 2005 in German-speaking Europe. Primarily produced by Diakovska and Stephen Ullmann, it debuted and peaked at number 84 on the German Albums Chart.

== Track listing ==
The Other Side – Standard edition
No.	Title	Length
1.	"The Other Side"	3:30
2.	"Livin' (New Beginning)"	3:51
3.	"Hole"	3:34
4.	"Misunderstood"	4:04
5.	"Move On"	3:31
6.	"Love Me"	3:55
7.	"Hold On Tight"	3:55
8.	"Everlasting"	3:06
9.	"Yours"	3:23
10.	"Overdose"	3:28
11.	"Lifetime"	3:54

Bonus track
No.	Title	Length
12.	"River Deep Mountain High" (featuring Bo Shannon, Juliette Schoppmann & Starboyzz)	7:52

== Charts ==
Chart (2005)	Peak position
German Albums (Offizielle Top 100)	84

== Release history ==
Region	Date	Format	Label
Austria	5 September 2005	Digital download, CD	Edel Records
Germany	5 September 2005	Digital download, CD	Edel Records
Switzerland	5 September 2005	Digital download, CD	Edel Records
