= One Life (No Angels song) =

Single by No Angels

from the album Welcome to the Dance
- Released: August 21, 2009
- Studio: Various: CI Music Studios, Berlin, Germany; Inner Court Studio, New Jersey, United States; Monarch Music, New Jersey, United States
- Genre: Dance-pop; electropop
- Length: 3:38
- Label: Polydor, Universal
- Songwriters: Nasri Atweh; Hakim Bell; Nadja Benaissa; Lucy Diakovska; Akene Dunkley; Adam Messinger; Sandy Mölling; Jessica Wahls
- Producers: Bell; Dunkley; Atweh (co.); Messinger (co.)

No Angels singles chronology
| "Disappear" (2008) | "One Life" (2009) | "Daylight in Your Eyes" (2021) |

"One Life" is a song by all-female German pop band No Angels. It was written by American musicians Nasri Atweh, Hakim Bell, Adam Messinger, Akene "The Champ" Dunkley, and group members Nadja Benaissa, Lucy Diakovska, Sandy Mölling, and Jessica Wahls for their fifth regular studio album Welcome to the Dance (2009). Produced by Bell and Dunkley, featuring additional production by The Messengers, consisting of Atweh and Messinger, the anthemic, self-manifesto song was created as a request to celebrate life, featuring autobiographical elements lyrically.

Musically, "One Life" introduced a change in sound for the quartet, as the track took the band's work further into the contemporary dance-pop and electropop genre predominantly associated with the introduction of the Welcome to the Dance album. Well received by critics, who commended on the group's musical development, it was premiered live at a concert in St. Pölten, Austria on July 3, 2009 and eventually released as the album's leading single on CD maxi single and as a digital download on August 21, 2009 in German-speaking Europe.

"One Life" debuted at number fifteen on the German singles chart, making it the band's fifteenth top twenty entry there, and number twenty-nine on the Ö3 Austria Top 40. While it completely failed to chart in Switzerland, the song became the band's first leading single to miss the German top five on the national chart. The only single release from Welcome to the Dance, it was the last single to feature founding member Benaissa who left the group in September 2010 following her suspended sentence.

== Background ==
In 2007, four members of the original line-up of No Angels reunited on their first studio album in four years. While the band's comeback effort Destiny (2007) was a commercial success, it received generally lukewarm reviews from music critics and, in comparison to earlier successes, it underperformed with a domestic sales total of about 30,000 copies. Its leading single "Goodbye to Yesterday" emerged as the album's only top ten hit, and although both the group members and their record company, Universal Music Domestic Pop, felt increasing discontent and uncertainty about the direction of the project by summer 2007, it was not until No Angels' participation in the Eurovision Song Contest 2008 in Belgrade, Serbia, the quartet hit an all-time career low, following their performance with the German ESC entry "Disappear," which finished 23rd out of the 25 countries that participated in the final voting in May 2008. As a direct consequence, planned recordings for the band's next studio album during the summer were indefinitely delayed, and the group went on a two-month hiatus to rethink and analyze the past year.

In July 2008, the band signed a management deal with Khalid Schröder's Kool Management. He subsequently arranged meetings with his North American clients for No Angels, including Canadian singer-songwriter Nasri Atweh and hip-hop producer Hakim "Prince Hakim" Bell, son of Kool founding member Robert Bell. In August 2008, whilst Nadja Benaissa spent her summer holidays with her daughter in Los Angeles, California, he spontaneously decided to send fellow band members Lucy Diakovska, Sandy Mölling, and Jessica Wahls overseas to join Benaissa for writing and recording sessions at New Kids on the Block singer Donnie Wahlberg's mansion, eventually green-lighting the start of the project. One of the first songs ever all four band members jointly started writing lyrics for, "One Life" was written during the second out of five separate studio sessions for the Welcome to the Dance album. Conceived during a creative session in Berlin, Germany in September 2009, the band began to work on melodic ideas for the song over an instrumental track by New Jersey hip-hop producer Akene "The Champ" Dunkley and Bell, both of them having previously worked with the group's management mates Kool & The Gang.

== Composition ==
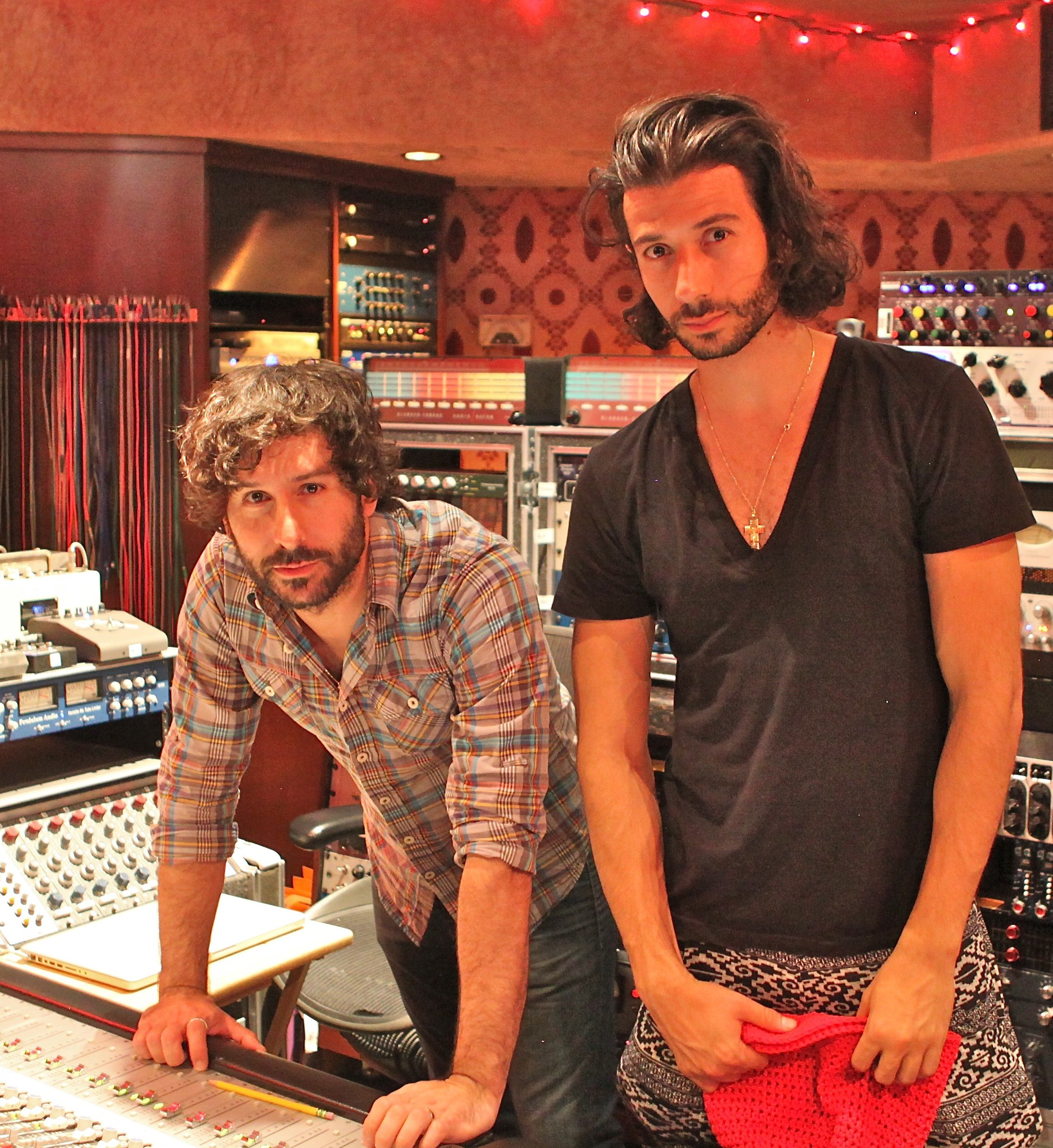
Canadian songwriting and production team The Messengers contributed to "One Life".

"One Life" is an uptempo electro-dance pop song, that runs a length of three minutes and 38 seconds. It was written by Nasri Atweh, Hakim Bell, Adam Messinger, Akene "The Champ" Dunkley, and all four group members, featuring main production by Bell and Dunkley. Atweh and Messinger of The Messengers share a co-production credit on the song. Set in a common time signature of 105 beats per minute, the song follows in the inspirational dance-pop theme of Welcome to the Dance. It is constructed in a verse-pre-chorus-chorus form, with Nadja Benaissa and Sandy Mölling sharing lead vocals. A rapped break before the third chorus, performed by Jessica Wahls, serves as a bridge, involving slight auto-tune effects. The lyrics of "One Life" feature the band members remembering the positive things in life following some tribulation, singing "I only got one life, one life / Tonight I'm gonna live mine, live mine / I'm gonna have a good time, good time / I wanna be free."

In an interview with NWZ network, Lucy Diakovska said that the team developed the concept of the song through mutual discussions. When asked about the meaning of the lyrics, she explained: "Well, we've never done anything hoping that it would materialize later. Now is now. Now is the moment, you exist. Later? What is later? Just live the moment and make the best of it." Nadja Benaissa added: "The song is about having only one life, never knowing what future brings next [...] and that's why you should live your life and enjoy it, even when you're in trouble." On their decision to release the track as the leading single, Diakovska further explained: "The song was done and we immediately knew: That's the track. That's the first single. That's the song that represents the album best [...] and everyone will love it, not just because it's positive but it radiates everything great in life."

== Release and reception ==
"One Life" received generally positive reviews from contemporary music critics many of whom declared it the album's standout track. Tanja Kraus from CDStarts.de felt that the single was one "the better tracks" on Welcome to the Dance and commended that it had "radio–catchy character on international standards." Bild summed "One Life" as "happy, optimistic [and] very danceable." Less enthusiastic, Claudia Nitsche from MonstersAndCritics.de called it "terribly boring." On May 14, 2009, Bell announced via Twitter that the first single from the album would be "One Life," his only contribution to Welcome to the Dance.

The song was officially serviced to German radio station on July 17, 2009 but not officially released as a download or on maxi single until on August 21. In Germany, "One Life" debuted and peaked at number 15 on the German singles chart, making it the band's only lead single not to reach the top ten. It spent three weeks within the top forty and fell out of the charts in its ninth week. While the single failed to chart in Switzerland, it reached top thirty of the Ö3 Austria Top 40, reaching number 29 in the week of September 4, 2009. In Austria, "One Life" became the group's highest-charting post-comeback single after "Goodbye to Yesterday," released in 2007. It left the charts after weeks. In 2022, "One Life" re-entered the German Download Chart at number 37 amid the opening night of the band's Celebration Tour.

== Music video ==
No Angels in their two-color ski suits, laying on a black floor.

An accompanying video for "One Life" was filmed in Berlin on July 8, 2009 and directed by German filmmaker, Ole Ziesemann. Production was handled by Mutter & Vater Productions GmbH, with Daniela Höller serving as assistant producer. Main camera was operated by Annabelle Handke, while Markus Koob was hired as second unit camera operator. Video editing was helmed by Christoph Heidrich. Marco da Silva, a former backing dancer of the group, handled the video's choreography.

The video features the four members of the band in individual shots, with Sandy Mölling performing in a narrow passage with glove-wearing hands caressing her from every direction, and Nadja Benaissa laying on top of neon lights stake, that she noted an ironic remark on her April 2009 arrest and the subsequent media scandal. Lucy Diakovska and Jessica Wahls each are seen performing individual dance routines with male dancers, dressed in either black overalls or pink light bulbs. During the chorus' the quartet can be seen wearing two-color ski suits, dancing in a highly stylized manner. The final video was fully premiered on German music television network VIVA on July 31, 2009.

== Track listings ==
CD maxi single
| No. | Title | Length |
|---|---|---|
| 1. | "One Life" (Single Version) | 3:38 |
| 2. | "One Life" (Pure Version) | 3:40 |

== Credits and personnel ==
Credits taken from Welcome to the Dance liner notes.

- Nasri Atweh – co-producer, programming, writer
- Nadja Benaissa – lead vocalist, writer
- Hakim Bell – producer, writer
- Lucy Diakovska – lead vocalist, writer
- Akene "The Champ" Dunkley – producer, programming, writer
- Adam Messinger – co-producer, mixing engineer, writer
- Sandy Mölling – lead vocalist, writer
- Götz-Michael Rieth – mastering engineer
- Khalid Schröder (Koolmanagement GmbH) – executive producer
- Jessica Wahls – lead vocalist, writer

== Live performances ==
The band has performed the track live at the following events:

- Sankt Pölten Stadtfest – July 3, 2009 (world premiere)
- Sat.1-Frühstücksfernsehen – August 21, 2009 (acoustic version)
- The Dome – August 21, 2009 (broadcast on September 5, 2009)
- ZDF Fernsehgarten – August 23, 2009
- KI.KA Live – September 3, 2009
- Stars for Free – September 5, 2009
- TV Total Stockcar Challenge Qualifying – October 9, 2009
- Die Neue Hitparade – October 10, 2009 (broadcast on November 7, 2009)
- Austria's Next Topmodel – November 25, 2009

== Charts ==
Chart performance for "One Life"
| Chart (2009) | Peak position |
|---|---|
| Austria (Ö3 Austria Top 40) | 29 |
| Germany (GfK) | 15 |

== Release history ==
Release dates and formats for "One Life"
| Region | Date | Formats | Label | Ref. |
|---|---|---|---|---|
| Various | July 16, 2009 | Internet leak | Polydor; Universal | |
| Various | July 17, 2009 | Contemporary hit radio | Polydor; Universal | |
| Various | August 21, 2009 | CD single; digital download | Polydor; Universal | |
