= Someday (No Angels song) =

Single by No Angels

from the album Pure
- Released: 13 July 2003
- Recorded: Department Studios (Frankfurt)
- Length: 3:16
- Label: Cheyenne; Polydor
- Songwriters: Niklas Hillbom; Thomas Jansson
- Producer: Thorsten Brötzmann

No Angels singles chronology
"No Angel (It's All in Your Mind)" (2003)	"Someday" (2003)	"Feelgood Lies" (2003)

"Someday" is a song performed by all-female German group No Angels. Written and composed by Swedish musicians Thomas Jansson and Niklas Hillbom, it was produced by frequent collaborator Thorsten Brötzmann for the band's third studio album Pure (2003). A latin-flavored pop song, the midtempo ballad's instrumentation includes flamenco guitars, castanets and synthesizers. Lyrically, "Someday" speaks of a woman realizing that her relationship has come to an end, though she is hopeful that she and her love interest will be able to resume their romance in another time and place.

The song received a mixed reception from music critics and was released as a single on 13 July 2003, the second song to precede the release of Pure. A moderate success, it reached number 16 in Austria and number 26 in Switzerland, while it charted at number five on the German Singles Chart where it became No Angels' seventh non-consecutive top five single. Katja Kuhl directed a music video for "Someday" near the Le Luc Formula One racing track in Var in southeastern France which features a love story between band member Vanessa Petruo and a male racing driver. The band premiered "Someday" during an acoustic concert in Munich club P1.

== Background ==
After Jessica Wahls' pregnancy break from the group and the end of the Four Seasons Tour, the remaining four members of No Angels began intensifying work on their then-untitled third studio album. Encouraged to exercise more self-control on the longplayer after their critically acclaimed contribution on predecessor Now... Us!, the band took over responsibility in composing, recording and selecting songs to guarantee a more personal theme on the album — a step that challenged criticism and growing scepticism among the band's label Cheyenne Records and recording company Polydor. "Someday" was written by Swedish musicians Thomas Jansson and Niklas Hillbom, while production was helmed by frequent collaborator, German producer Thorsten Brötzmann. Recorded at Department Studios in Frankfurt am Main, it was mixed by Jeo, while vocal recording was overseen by Klaus Üblacker. Keyboards were handled by Michael Knauer, Stefan Hansen, Jeo and Brötzmann, while guitars were played by Peter Weihe. One of the first songs recorded for Pure, No Angels first performed "Someday" at an acoustic concert in Munich club P1 in spring 2003.

== Commercial performance ==
Released on 13 July 2003 as the second single to precede parent album Pure, "Someday" debuted and peaked at number five on the German Singles Chart in the week of 28 July 2003. The band's seventh top five hit in Germany, it would remain nine weeks on the chart. In Austria, the song opened and peaked at number 16 on the Austrian Singles Chart. No Angels' eighth top 20 entry on the chart, it spent 13 weeks inside the top 75, falling off the chart in late October 2003. In Switzerland, "Someday" reached number 36 on the Swiss Singles Chart, becoming the band's highest-charting single since "Still in Love with You" (2002). It spent six weeks inside the chart's top 100.

== Music video ==
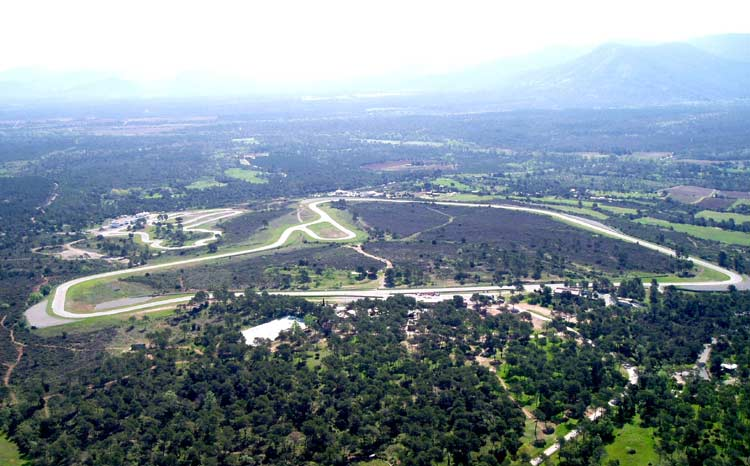
The music video for "Someday" was filmed near the Le Luc Formula One racing track in Var (pictured).

The music video for "Someday" was directed by German filmmaker Katja Kuhl and produced for Bigfish Filmproduktion. The visuals were filmed on various locations near the Le Luc Formula One racing track in Var, a department of southeastern France, in the week of 9 June 2003. Camera was operated by Martin Ruhe throughout shooting, with Alexander Palm serving as his first assistant. Timo Fritsche was hired as editor, while Sabine Haarer was responsible for styling.

The music video for "Someday" was filmed over a span of twenty hours. Choreographed sequences were largely omitted due to band member Nadja Benaissa sustaining a cruciate ligament rupture in the run-up to production. The narrative centers on a romantic storyline between Vanessa Petruo and a male racing driver. Benaissa appears as both the fictional author of the story and Petruo's on-screen friend. Bandmates Sandy Mölling and Lucy Diakovska portray a mechanic and a fellow racing driver, respectively, both employed at the same garage. "Someday" worldpremiered on MTV Central's daily live show MTV Select on 25 June 2003.

== Track listings ==
CD maxi single
No.	Title	Writer(s)	Producer(s)	Length
1.	"Someday" (Radio Edit)	Niklas Hillbom; Thomas Jansson	Thorsten Brötzmann	3:15
2.	"Someday" (Extended Mix)	Hillbom; Jansson	Brötzmann	4:24
3.	"Someday" (Karaoke – Instrumental)	Hillbom; Jansson	Brötzmann	3:14
4.	"Someday" (Live at the Club)	Hillbom; Jansson	Brötzmann	3:57
5.	"2 Get Over U" (Big Band Version)	Sandi Strmljan; Tim Brettschneider; Alan Glass	Till Brönner; Jens Kuphal	3:23

2-track Pock-It single
No.	Title	Writer(s)	Producer(s)	Length
1.	"Someday" (Radio Edit)	Hillbom; Jansson	Brötzmann	3:15
2.	"Someday" (Instrumental)	Hillbom; Jansson	Brötzmann	3:12

== Credits and personnel ==
Credits adapted from the liner notes of Pure.

- Nadja Benaissa – vocals
- Thorsten Brötzmann – keyboards, producer
- Lucy Diakovska – vocals
- Nik Hafemann – supervising producer
- Stefan Hansen – keyboards
- Michael Knauer – keyboards
- Joachim "Jeo" Mezei – keyboards, mixing
- Sandy Mölling – vocals
- Vanessa Petruo – vocals
- Klaus Üblacker – vocal recording
- Peter Weihe – guitar

== Charts ==
Weekly chart performance for "Someday"
Chart (2003)	Peak Position
Austria (Ö3 Austria Top 40)	16
Europe (Eurochart Hot 100)	19
Germany (GfK)	5
Switzerland (Schweizer Hitparade)	36

== Release history ==
Release dates and formats for "Feelgood Lies"
Region	Date	Format	Label	Ref
Various	13 July 2003	CD single; digital download	Cheyenne; Polydor	

== Cover versions ==
- In 2002, French singer Ève Angeli covered the song in French, as "Sans Toi" (Without You), from her second album Nos différences.
- In 2003, entertainer Belinda covered the song in Spanish, as "Lo Puedo Lograr" (I Can Get It), from her debut album.
