= Feelgood Lies =

Single by No Angels

from the album Pure
- Released: 22 September 2003
- Studio: Redfly Studios (Stockholm, Sweden)
- Length: 3:22
- Label: Cheyenne; Polydor
- Songwriters: Pelle Ankarberg; Charlie Dore; Niclas Molinder; Maryann Morgan; Joacim Persson
- Producers: Twin; Pelle Ankarberg

No Angels singles chronology
"Someday" (2003)	"Feelgood Lies" (2003)	"Reason" (2003)

"Feelgood Lies" is a song by all-female German pop band No Angels. It was written by Pelle Ankarberg, Charlie Dore, Niclas Molinder, Maryann Morgan and Joacim Persson for the group's third studio album Pure (2003), while production was helmed by Molinder and Persson under their production moniker Twin, with Ankarberg serving as co-producer. A dark urban dance pop song that is built upon a heavy guitar riff and uplifting strings, the subjects of "Feelgood Lies" are revenge and karma. Not wanting to feel broken-hearted, the female protagonist warns a love interest to check his alibis.

The song was picked as the album's third and final single. Released on 22 September 2003 in German-speaking Europe, following the official announcement of the group's indefinite hiatus in fall 2003, "Feelgood Lies" peaked at number three in Germany, number twelve in Austria, and number 29 in Switzerland at the singles charts, becoming the highest-selling single to be lifted from parent album Pure. Its accompanying music video was directed by Marcus Sternberg and filmed at the Photonics Center in Adlershof, Berlin. Twin later worked portions of "Feelgood Lies" into American recording artist Ashley Tisdale's song "Be Good to Me" (2006).

== Background ==
"Feelgood Lies" was written by frequent No Angels collaborators Pelle Ankarberg, Charlie Dore, Niclas Molinder, Maryann Morgan and Joacim Persson, and produced, mixed, arranged and recorded by Molinder and Persson under their production moniker Twin for Redfly Music, with Ankarberg serving as co-producer. All music was recorded and mixed at RedFly Studios in Sweden, while vocals recording was overseen by Nik Hafemann at the d2p Studios. Fredrik Norburg played the guitar, with keyboards and programming provided by Molinder and Persson. Additional background vocals were contributed by No Angels and Morgan.

== Release and reception ==
While Cheyenne Records initially announced "Eleven Out of Ten" as the third single to be lifted from Pure, the band requested uptempo song "Feelgood Lies," another song by Swedish production team Twin, as their next single. Physical singles of the song were eventually released on 22 September 2003 by Cheyenne Records – two weeks after the announcement of their indefinite hiatus towards the end of the year. The maxi single involves several remixes of "Feelgood Lies," including radio and video versions, as well as previously unreleased record "In My Head," produced by Thorsten Brötzmann and written by Henrik Nielsen.

In Germany, "Feelgood Lies" debuted at number five on the German Singles Chart in the week of 6 October 2003, and peaked at number three in its third week. It fell out of the top twenty in its seventh week and left the chart after eleven weeks, becoming the 69th highest-selling single of 2003 in Germany as well as the biggest-selling single from Pure. In Austria, the single debuted at number 16 on the Ö3 Austria Top 40. It reached number twelve its fourth week and spent 15 weeks within the top 75. In Switzerland, "Feelgood Lies" deduted at number 31 on the Swiss Hitparade and reached its peak, number 29, the following week. It spent eight weeks on the chart, becoming the highest-charting single from Pure as well as the band's best-charting single since "Still in Love with You," released in 2002, in that territory.

== Music video ==
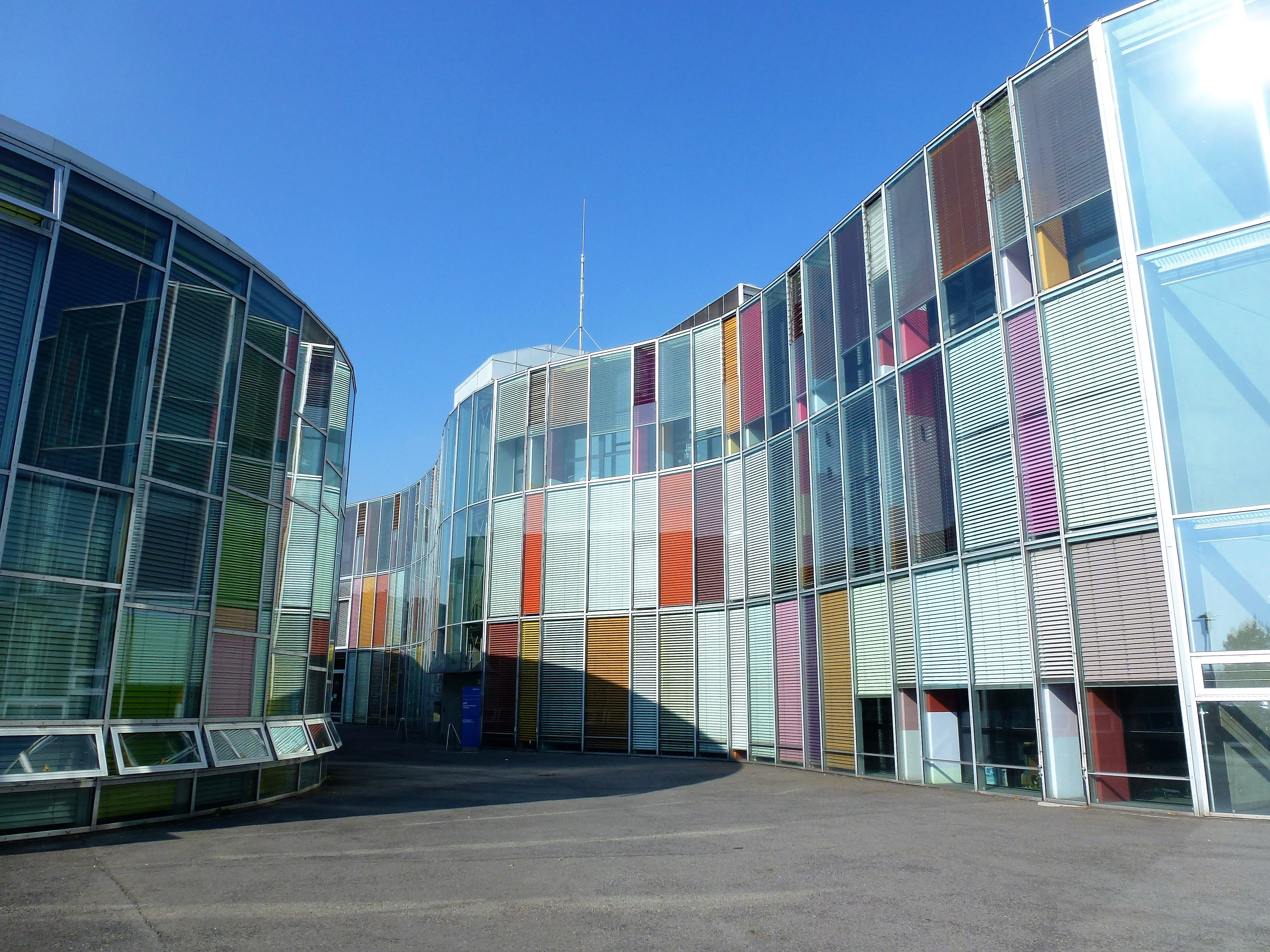
The music video for "Feelgood Lies" was filmed at the Photonics Center in Berlin-Adlershof (pictured).

The visuals for "Feelgood Lies" were No Angels' fifth music video to be directed and produced by German filmmaker Marcus Sternberg for Sternberg Filmproduktion. Sternberg was assisted by his AD Jan "TC" Zimpel, with Miklas Wittmann serving as production driver and runner. Choreography was overseen by Canadian dancer and choreographer Sean Cheesman, while former Fame Academy contestant and Become One member David Hernandez appears as Sandy Mölling's backing dancer.

Filming of "Feelgood Lies" took place at the Photonics Center in Adlershof, Berlin in the week of August 4 during the 2003 European heat wave. The video does not follow a storyline but focuses on scenes with choreographies and futuristic designs, featuring scenes of Nadja Benaissa, Lucy Diakovska, Mölling, and Vanessa Petruo wearing colorful outfits in yellow, orange, and pink, while dancing with their four male background dancers. Sequences are intercutted by several close shots and computer animations, including fyling propellers and helicopters, and set expansions like glass buildings. After four weeks of post-production through Capture Berlin GmbH & Co KG, the edited video premiered on VIVA and MTV Germany on 3 September 2003.

== Track listings ==
Maxi single
No.	Title	Writer(s)	Producer(s)	Length
1.	"Feelgood Lies" (Radio Version)	Maryann Morgan; Niclas Molinder; Joacim Persson; Pelle Ankarberg; Charlie Dore	Twin	3:19
2.	"Feelgood Lies" (Video Version)	Morgan; Molinder; Persson; Ankarberg; Dore	Twin	3:37
3.	"Feelgood Lies" (Jiggy Joint Remix)	Morgan; Molinder; Persson; Ankarberg; Dore	Twin	3:34
4.	"Feelgood Lies" (Instrumental)	Morgan; Molinder; Persson; Ankarberg; Dore	Twin; Jiggy Joint^{[a]}	3:16
5.	"In My Head"	Henrik Nielsen	Thorsten Brötzmann	3:47

2-track CD single
No.	Title	Writer(s)	Producer(s)	Length
1.	"Feelgood Lies" (Radio Version)	Morgan; Molinder; Persson; Ankarberg; Dore	Twin	3:19
2.	"Feelgood Lies" (Jiggy Joint Remix)	Morgan; Molinder; Persson; Ankarberg; Dore	Twin; Jiggy Joint^{[a]}	3:34

Notes

- ^{^a} denotes additional producer

== Credits and personnel ==
Credits adapted from the liner notes of Pure.

- Pelle Ankarberg – co-production
- Nadja Benaissa – vocals
- Lucy Diakovska – vocals
- Nik Hafemann – vocal production
- Sandy Mölling – vocals
- Maryann Morgan – background vocals
- Fredrik Norburg – guitars
- Vanessa Petruo – vocals
- Twin – production, keyboard, programming
- Jessica Wahls – vocals

== Charts ==
=== Weekly charts ===
Weekly chart performance for "Feelgood Lies"
Chart (2003)	Peak position
Austria (Ö3 Austria Top 40)	12
CIS Airplay (TopHit)	78
Germany (GfK)	3
Russia Airplay (TopHit)	65
Switzerland (Schweizer Hitparade)	29

=== Year-end charts ===
Year-end chart performance for "Feelgood Lies"
Chart (2003)	Position
CIS (TopHit)	113
Germany (Media Control GfK)	69
Russia Airplay (TopHit)	94

== Release history ==
Release dates and formats for "Feelgood Lies"
Region	Date	Format	Label	Ref
Various	22 September 2003	CD single; digital download	Cheyenne; Polydor	
