= Pure (No Angels album) =

Studio album by No Angels
- Released: 25 August 2003
- Length: 71:55; 87:23 (ltd. edition)
- Labels: Cheyenne; Polydor
- Producers: Thorsten Brötzmann; Lucy Diakovska; Nik Hafemann; Tobias Lundgren; Niclas Molinder; Perky Park; Joacim Persson; Peter Ries; Nigel Rush; Stephan Ullmann

No Angels chronology
When the Angels Swing (2002)	Pure (2003)	The Best of No Angels (2003)

Singles from Pure
- 1. "No Angel (It's All in Your Mind)" Released: 22 April 2003; 2. "Someday" Released: 13 July 2003; 3. "Feelgood Lies" Released: 22 September 2003

Pure is the third studio album by all-female German pop group No Angels. It was released by Cheyenne Records and Polydor on 25 August 2003. Conceived after the departure of original member Jessica Wahls, the project marked No Angels's first studio release as a quartet and their final album before their temporary disbandment in fall 2003. The remaining four members reteamed with frequent collaborators Thorsten Brötzmann and Peter Ries to work on the majority of the album, with additional songwriting and production contribution from Tobias Lundgren, Perky Park, Nigel Rush, Stephan Ullman, and Twin.

Recorded at the Department-2-Studios in Frankfurt, Pure is predominately a pop album with slight elements of electronic, pop rock and Latin music, marking a departure from the contemporary R&B and teen pop-oriented sound of previous projects; its lyrics explore themes of heartbreak, love, family, and escapism. Elaborating a more grown-up theme for the album, the band requested promotional material to depict a serious, less girlish image. Pure was released to generally mixed reviews from music critics, many of whom praised the slower songs on the album but found the rest of the material too generic

Despite failing to match the commercial success of the group's two previous albums Elle'ments (2001) and Now... Us! (2002), Pure became No Angels' third consecutive chart-topper on the German Albums Chart and was eventually certified gold by the Bundesverband Musikindustrie (BVMI). It also peaked at number two and nine in Austria and Switzerland, respectively, and produced three top five singles, including the band's fourth number-one hit "No Angel (It's All in Your Mind)". A 2004 concert tour in support of the album, the Pure Acoustic Tour, was cancelled after the group's announcement of their disbandment in fall 2003.

== Background ==
In June 2002, No Angels released their second album, Now... Us!, which received acclaim from many critics who believed the band would not last past their first album. Another major commercial success for the group, it debuted at number one on the German Albums Chart. Following an exclusive swing concert at the Tränenpalast in Berlin in October, No Angels soon followed with a swing album, When the Angels Swing, featuring their biggest hits and selected songs from their first two albums, re-arranged by German jazz musician Till Brönner. Critically acclaimed by critics, the album reached number nine of the German Albums Chart, eventually going gold. In November, the girls embarked on their second national concert tour, the Four Seasons Tour, playing sell-out shows in theatres across German-speaking Europe.

After Jessica Wahls' pregnancy break from the group and the end of the tour, the remaining four members of No Angels began intensifying work on their then-untitled third studio album. Encouraged to exercise more self-control on the longplayer, the band took over responsibility in composing, recording and selecting songs to guarantee a more personal theme on the album — a step that challenged criticism and growing scepticism among the band's label Cheyenne Records and recording company Polydor. "We selected song for us, which are best pop music, sort absolutely well with us, and represent at best what we want to talk about," band member Sandy Mölling said in an interview during the album's release. Impressed by the intensity of the musical output, the group settled on the album title Pure. "The music is very, very pure, [...] there's nothing we had to dissemble for, the album shows who we really are [musically]."

== Recording and production ==
Recording of all vocals on Pure took place at the Department-2-Studios in Frankfurt. Unlike with previous sessions, the remaining four band members did not record together. Instead, each member would record on her own in the studio, while vocal mixing was provided by engineers. Vocal production was supervised by frequent collaborator Nik Hafemann, with Nadja Benaissa and Vanessa Petruo contributing to the arrangement of the vocal harmonies. Petruo als penned opening track "Sister", another collaboration with songwriter Alex Geringas and producer Thorsten Brötzmann, both of whom had co-written their number-one hit "Something About Us" (2001). The strings-led mid-tempo song chronicles Petruo's fallout with her father, actor Thomas Petruo, and their subsequent reconciliation. Kids voices were provided by Brötzmann's daughters Sina and Lisa-Maria.

Brötzmann produced another five songs on Pure, including the uplifting Latin-flavored mid tempo song "Someday" and the melancholic Latin ballad "Angel of Mine" both of which were compared to their 2002 single "Still in Love with You". He also contributed to the up tempo song "So What" and Petruo's solo song "Ten Degrees" as well as an acoustic version of Dutch musician Robbie van Leeuwen's 1969 song "Venus". The band reportedly disliked their Bananarama-influenced original rendition of the song which they had recorded as testimonials for Gillette's Venus division of razors for women in early 2003. Production on "Eleven Out of Ten", a cover version of the same-titled 2003 song by Swedish girl group Play, was helmed by Tobias Lundgren, while its songwriters, Swedish production duo Twin, provided production on the beat-driven "Feelgood Lies".

Further six tracks were produced by Peter Ries, another longtime contributor of the band, including the electronic ballad "New Beginning" and the warm acoustic ballad "Washes Over Me". His production on "You Lied" was compared to the synth sounds of British electronic musician William Orbit with whom Cheyenne Records had been in negotiations for a possible collaboration on the song, but plans fell through. "Forever Yours" incorporates slight elements of Arabic music, while "Takes a Woman to Know" combines strings and keyboard arrangements with Italian folk music. Ries also produced "Soft Place to Fall", Benaissa's solo song, who rejected a self-written but "dramatic and melancholic" composition in favor of his track, as well as Diakovka's solo song, the rock pop-heavy "Confession". Production on another rock pop song, lead single "No Angel (It's All in Your Mind)", was overseen by Perky Park and Hafemann.

== Promotion ==
Pure was preceded by lead single "No Angel (It's All in Your Mind)," released on 22 April 2003. A mid-tempo pop rock track about picture-perfect illusions in a relationship. it marked No Angels' first release without Wahls' vocals on it. Another commercial success for the group, the song became their fourth number-one hit on the German Singles Chart. It also placed tenth in Austria, where it would become the band's seventh top ten entry on the Austrian Singles Chart, but was significantly less successful in Switzerland, where it peaked at number 46, a breakaway from the success of previous leading singles. Follow-up "Someday," a latin pop-flavored love song, was issued on 13 July 2003. It became the band's seventh top ten hit in Germany and while it peaked at number five, it would become the album's lowest-charting single in Germany.

On 27 August 2003, the band announced that they would embark on their third concert tour, the Pure Acoustic Tour, in early 2004. Inspired by Acoustic Angels, their special one-off unplugged performance at the P1 club in Munich in March 2003, during which they had previewed some then unknown songs from Pure, including "No Angels (It's All in Your Mind)", "Someday" and "Washes Over Me," the tour was scheduled to commence on 31 January 2024 at the Stadthalle Bielefeld and conclude on 28 February 2004 at the Grugahalle in Essen, comprising 22 dates across Austria, Germany, Luxembourg, and Switzerland. Ticket sales and reservations began on 3 September 2023.

Only two days later, on 5 September 2023, the group revealed that they would not come together for a new project in 2004 and were instead preparing their official disbandment towards the end of the year. While No Angels manager Regina Weber initially announced that all scheduled Pure Acoustic Tour dates would take place as expected, the tour was eventually cancelled only days after, leading to a breach of contract between Cheyenne Records and concert agency Marek Lieberberg. On 22 September 2003, "Feelgood Lies," the third and final single from Pure was released. The song became the album's third consecutive top five hit on the German Singles Chart, peaking at number three, and marked Pure's only top thirty entry in Switzerland. Following the physical release of "Feelgood Lies," the album's promotion officially ended in favor of The Best of No Angels (2003).

== Critical reception ==
Professional ratings
Review scores
Source	Rating
CDStarts	3/10
laut.de	2/5 stars

Pure was released to generally mixed reviews from music critics, many of whom praised the slower songs on the album but found the rest of the material too generic. MusikWoche remarked that the strength of the album was its ballads and cited songs such as "New Beginning", "Washes Over Me" as well as the band's rendition of "Venus" as the "quiet, rousing highlights" of the album. The media magazine concluded: "The third studio album of No Angels is not as 'pure' as the title might suggest. But it is a successful proof of their heavenly vocal power." Marie-Louise Leinhos from magazine Aviva felt that "the album is an imaginative work with varied songs [that] is also experimental and open to new influences." She called Pure “another solid continuation” to their discography as well as a "classically crafted pop album with danceable parts." Similarly, Sachar Kriwoj from Berlin magazine Brainstorms! called the album a "dedication to everyone who loves good pop."

Matthias Reichel from online magazine CDStarts criticized the album for its "overbalancing status of filling material" and rated the album three stars ouf of ten. He commented: "In principle, everything on Pure is unchanged: A few 'highlights' are flanked by soulless mass products that are on b-side level at best." However, Reichel felt that single releases such as "Someday", "No Angel (It's All in Your Mind)" and "Feelgood Lies" as well as "Forever Yours" and "New Beginning" confirmed the songwriters' skills for catchy, radio-friendly tunes. Similarly, laut.de editor Vicky Butscher found that Pure was less of a personal album instead of a collection of "typical boy or girl group repertoire". She rated the album two out of five stars and remarked that the album was drawing inspiration from Madonna's 1998 studio album Ray of Light, particularly on "You Lied", as well as British female groups such as All Saints and the Sugababes. Satisfied with later half of the album though, she concluded: "The best thing would be for No Angels to focus on ballads in the future. Anyone who listens to "New Beginning" or "Washes Over Me" knows why. Also, the re-arranged "Venus" is much more beautiful, than the pop jingle." SWR3 called Pure a "pop album worth listening to with excursions into funk and soul."

== Chart performance ==
Released on 25 August 2003, Pure debuted at number one on the German Albums Chart in the week of 8 September 2003. It marked the band's third consecutive studio album to reach the top position on this particular chart. Due to the announcement of their disbandment two weeks after its release, promotional efforts for No Angels soon shifted to their first compilation The Best of No Angels (2003) after the release of Pure's third single "Feelgood Lies" in late September 2003. Pure, however, fell out of the top ten in its sixth week of release but remained on the chart until late December 2003. While not as commercially successful as its predecessors Elle'ments (2001) and Now... Us! (2002), both of which had been promoted significantly longer and spawned several reissues and special editions, it was eventually awarded a gold certification by the Bundesverband Musikindustrie (BVMI) for selling more than 100,000 copies. In Germany, Pure ranked fifty-second on the national year-end chart.

In Austria, Pure became No Angels's third consecutive studio album to reach the top two of the Austrian Albums Chart. Upon its debut week, it was blocked from the top spot by Dead Letters (2003), the fifth album by Finnish rock band The Rasmus. While Pure failed to place on the national year end chart and was left uncertified, it spent twelve weeks on the chart. In Switzerland, the album became the group's third top ten album. The second highest new entry of the week after American R&B singer Mary J. Blige's album Love & Life (2003), it debuted at number nine on the Swiss Albums Chart. While none of Pure's singles managed to reach the top twenty of the Swiss Singles Chart, the album would spend one week within the top ten and remain another eight weeks on the chart. Pure also peaked at number ten on Billboard's European Top 100 Albums chart.

== Track listing ==
Pure – Standard edition
No.	Title	Writer(s)	Producer(s)	Length
1.	"Sister"	Vanessa Petruo; Thorsten Brötzmann; Alexander Geringas	Brötzmann	3:26
2.	"Eleven Out of Ten"	Niclas Molinder; Joacim Persson; Pelle Ankarberg; Charlie Dore	Tobias Lundgren	3:37
3.	"So What"	Denise Adam; Jane Dobbins; Pete Kirtley; Tim Hawes	Brötzmann	3:12
4.	"Angel of Mine"	Stephan Browarczyk; Mirko von Schlieffen; Alexandra Prince; Christoph Brüx	Brötzmann	3:43
5.	"Forever Yours"	Fredrik Thomander; Anders Wikström	Peter Ries	3:25
6.	"Someday"	Thomas Jansson; Niklas Hillbom	Brötzmann	3:16
7.	"You Lied"	Suzanne Smith; Sandy Frederickson; Kit Hain	Ries	4:09
8.	"Feelgood Lies"	Maryann Morgan; Molinder; Persson; Ankarberg; Dore	Twin	3:22
9.	"No Angel (It's All in Your Mind)"	Kirtley; Hawes; Liz Winstanley	Perky Park; Nik Hafemann	3:14
10.	"Takes a Woman to Know"	Dore; Terry Britten	Ries	3:36
11.	"New Beginning"	Thomas Who; Negin Djafari	Ries	4:00
12.	"Washes Over Me"	Arlene Gold; Brian Nash; Mike Post	Ries	4:13
13.	"Venus" (including Pure outtakes)	Robbie van Leeuwen	Brötzmann	3:18
Total length:				71:55

Pure – Limited edition (Bonus CD)
No.	Title	Writer(s)	Producer(s)	Length
1.	"Soft Place to Fall" (Nadja's song)	Allan Simpson	Peter Ries	3:26
2.	"Confession" (Lucy's song)	Lucy Diakovska	Stephan Ullman; Diakovska	3:59
3.	"How Can We Be Friends" (Sandy's song)	Pam Sheyne; Sean Hosein; Dane Deviller	Nigel Rush	3:38
4.	"Ten Degrees" (Vanessa's song)	Petruo; Brötzmann; Geringas	Brötzmann	3:25
Total length:				87:23

== Personnel ==
- Thomas Blug – guitar
- Thorsten Brötzmann – keyboards
- Alan Darby – acoustic guitar, electric guitar
- Flo Daunber – drums
- Stefan Hansen – keyboards
- Clemens Heger – bass
- Jeo – keyboards
- Jens Kempgens – violin
- Stephan Keller – piano
- Michael Knauer – keyboards
- Björn Krumbügel – keyboards
- Marco Lehmann – keyboards
- Fredrik Norburg – guitar
- Peter Ries – keyboards
- Ben Robbins – keyboards
- Nigel Rush – keyboards
- Ossi Schaller – guitar
- Peter Weihe – guitar

=== Production ===
- Mathias Bothor – photography
- Justin Broad – engineer
- Lisa-Marie Brötzmann – vocal assistance
- Sina Brötzmann – vocal assistance
- Freda Goodlet – vocal assistance
- Nik Hafemann – supervising producer
- Trevor Hurst – engineer
- Jeo – engineer
- Tobias Lundgren – engineer
- Maryan Morgan – vocal assistance
- Alexa Phazer – vocal assistance
- Ronald Reinsberg – artwork
- Peter Ries – engineer
- Pam Sheyne – vocal assistance
- Jörg Steinfadt – engineer
- Klaus Überlacker – engineer
- Rick Washington – vocal assistance
- Ulf Zwerger – engineer

== Charts ==
=== Weekly charts ===
Weekly chart performance for Pure
Chart (2003)	Peak position
Austrian Albums (Ö3 Austria)	2
European Top 100 Albums (Billboard)	10
German Albums (Offizielle Top 100)	1
Swiss Albums (Schweizer Hitparade)	4

=== Year-end charts ===
Year-end chart performance for Pure
Chart (2003)	Rank
German Albums (Official Top 100)	52

== Certifications ==
Certifications for Pure
Region	Certification	Certified units/sales
Germany (BVMI)	Gold	100,000^{^}
^{^} Shipments figures based on certification alone.

== Release history ==
Pure release history
Region	Date	Edition	Format	Label	Ref.
Austria	25 August 2003	Standard	CD; digital download	Cheyenne; Polydor	
Germany	25 August 2003	Standard	CD; digital download	Cheyenne; Polydor	
Switzerland	25 August 2003	Standard	CD; digital download	Cheyenne; Polydor	
