= No Angels =

German all-female pop group

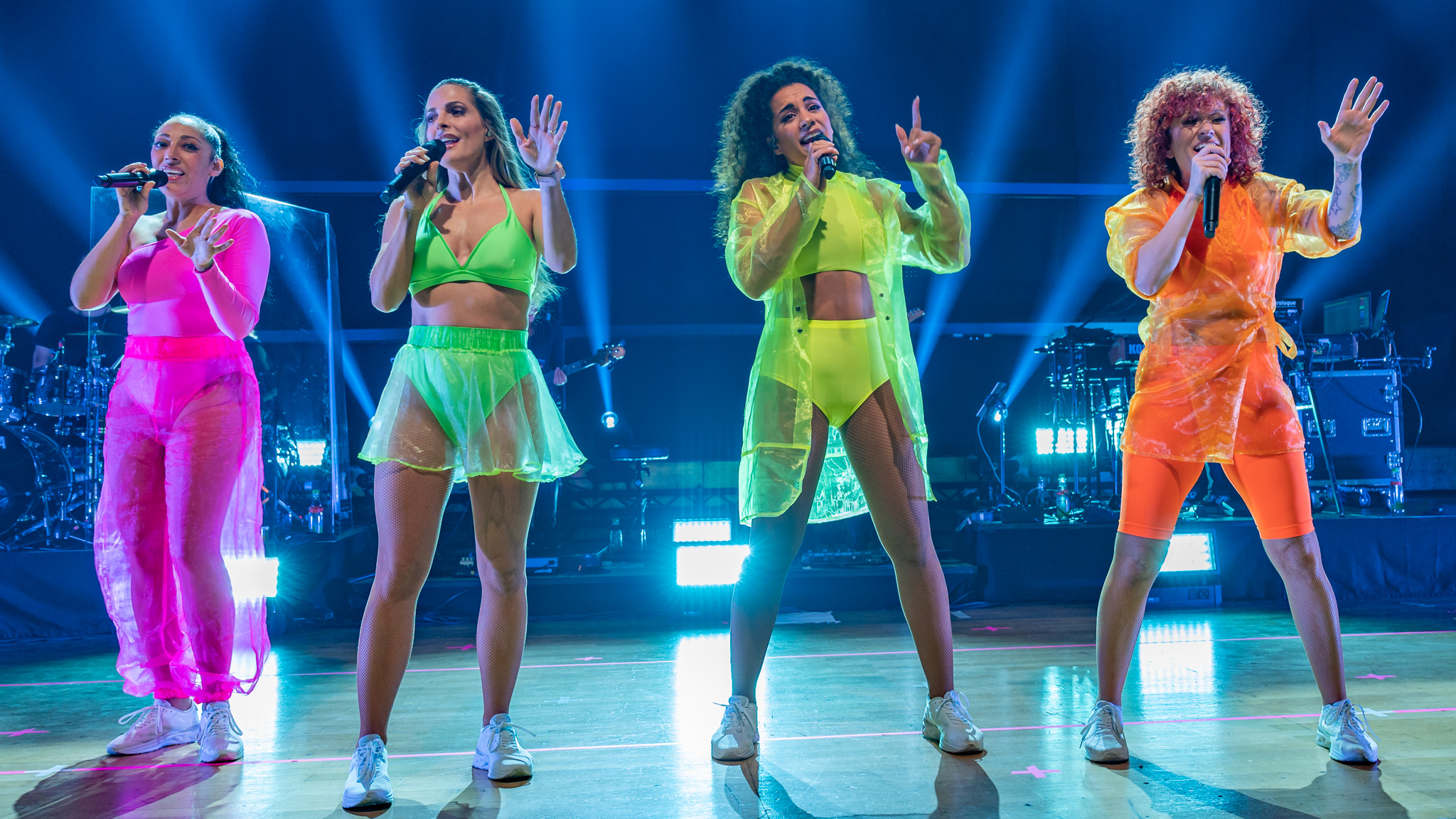
- Left to right: Jessica Wahls, Sandy Mölling, Nadja Benaissa, and Lucy Diakovska performing in 2022

Background information
- Origin: Germany
- Genres: Pop; electropop; Europop
- Works: No Angels discography
- Years active: 2000–2004; 2007–2014; 2021–present
- Labels: Cheyenne; BMG; Stars by Edel
- Members: Nadja Benaissa; Lucy Diakovska; Sandy Mölling; Jessica Wahls
- Past members: Vanessa Petruo

No Angels are an all-female pop group formed in 2000 during the debut season of the German adaptation of the talent series Popstars. Originally a quintet, consisting of Nadja Benaissa, Lucy Diakovska, Sandy Mölling, Vanessa Petruo, and Jessica Wahls, the band quickly became one of the most commercially successful pop acts in German music history. Their debut single, "Daylight in Your Eyes" (2001), reached number one in several European countries and is among the best-selling singles in Germany. Their first album, Elle'ments (2001), likewise topped the charts and initiated a series of number-one releases, major tours, and industry awards.

In the years that followed, No Angels solidified their position as a leading pop group with the albums Now... Us! (2002) and Pure (2003). The group disbanded temporarily in late 2003 but reunited in 2007 in a modified lineup to release their fourth studio album Destiny, after which they represented Germany at the Eurovision Song Contest 2008. After Welcome to the Dance (2009) underperformed commercially, the group became inactive once more in 2010. Since 2021, the quartet has resumed activity with anniversary projects and new releases, including the albums 20 (2021) and It's Christmas (2025) as well as increasing touring engagements.

No Angels have won three ECHOs, a World Music Award, a NRJ Music Award, two Comets, a Bambi and a Goldene Kamera, among others. They are widely regarded as a significant pop-cultural phenomenon of the 2000s and, with four number-one hits, four number-one albums and record sales of more than 5.0 million, the most successful German girl group to date. Beyond chart success, they attracted attention for their diverse lineup, visual identity, and public engagement. Their commercial achievements, influence on teenage and pop culture, and lasting presence in the German music market have established them as one of the defining acts of the talent show era in the German-speaking world.

== History ==
=== 2000: Formation on Popstars ===
The members of No Angels were selected on the RTL2 channel's first series of Popstars, a reality talent show which set about producing a five-piece girl group. Acquired by Tresor TV television producer Holger Roost-Macias at the MIPTV Media Market event in Cannes, France, in 2000, the series was the third adaptation of the format following both an Australian and a New Zealand version. In August and September of the same year, over 4,300 hopefuls turned up to auditions in Hamburg, Berlin, Frankfurt, Leipzig, Cologne, Oberhausen, Stuttgart and Munich which required both singing and dancing experience. The judges consisted of Dutch entertainer Simone Angel, concert booker Mario M. Mendrzycki and Rainer Moslener, an A&R director of Polydor Records.

32 out of 200 girls eventually made it from the local recall shows to Mallorca, Spain, to get trained in singing, dancing, and fitness. While the judges continued eliminating two or three girls each day with the help of choreographer Detlef Soost and British vocal coach Robert Bicknel, eleven finalists remained and were sent home to prepare. After a final elimination round, Nadja Benaissa, Lucy Diakovska, Sandy Mölling, Vanessa Petruo and Jessica Wahls were chosen, and signed a recording contract with Polydor. Managed by Joy Berhanu during their first year, the girls were named No Angels following a public televoting and moved in together near Munich. With the final members of the group in place, the program followed the group during its recording sessions, photo and music video shoots and other promotional commitments such as showcases and instores. The show concluded with the band's first public live performance at The Dome at the Dortmunder Westfalenhalle in February 2001.

=== 2001: Commercial breakthrough with Elle'ments ===
After weeks of recording, No Angels released their debut single, "Daylight in Your Eyes" on 5 February 2001. The song instantly entered the top position on the Austrian, German and Swiss Singles and Airplay Charts, making it one of the most successful debuts of the year. Selling over one million copies, the song also proved to be a hit outside German-speaking Europe when it entered the singles charts of France, Latvia, Poland and the United Kingdom, and even became a number-one success in Brazil, and Estonia. Although an alternate version of the original music video was filmed for the North American market the following year, both the video and the song saw minor commercial success overseas. However, "Daylight in Your Eyes" peaked at number 36 on the Billboard Hot Singles Sales chart in June 2002.

"Daylight in Your Eyes" (2001)
The first single from Elle'ments.

The band released their debut album, Elle'ments. Involving production by German producers Thorsten Brötzmann, Leslie Mandoki, and Peter Ries, Elle'ments also entered the Austrian, German and Swiss Albums Chart at number-one. No Angels broke records for becoming the "first act to ever debut at the top position in Austria, Germany, and Switzerland with both its debut single and debut album." The album would go on to sell more than one million copies worldwide, making it the biggest-selling German album of 2001. Elle'ments was eventually certified triple platinum and septuplicate gold by the IFPI, and earned the band several internationally acclaimed prizes such as a Bambi, two ECHO Awards and a World Music Award.

Riding a wave of publicity and hype, the group's second single, "Rivers of Joy", became a top ten hit, while third single, "There Must Be an Angel", a cover version of the 1985 hit by British pop duo Eurythmics, continued the group's high record sales by topping the charts once again in Austria and Germany. The last single released from Elle'ments was a double A-side of album cut "When the Angels Sing", and "Atlantis", a duet with the song's original performer Donovan. The band had re-recorded the song for the closing credits of the Walt Disney Feature Animation picture Atlantis: The Lost Empire. It became a top five entry in Germany, and was subsequently certified Gold. Following this and two encounters as the opening act for the German leg of both DJ Bobo and Westlife's 2001 concert tours, No Angels embarked on their first own concert tour in October 2001. Compiling more than 30 dates, the tour concluded in December 2001 with all shows reportedly being sold out.

=== 2002: Career development on Now... Us! ===
In June 2002, No Angels released their second album, Now... Us!, which featured co-writes by all members and received critical acclaim from many critics who believed the band would not last past their first album. The album debuted at number one on the German Album Chart and at number two and four on the Austrian and Swiss albums chart respectively, and was eventually certified platinum and double gold by the IFPI. Producers such as Mousse T. consulted on Now... Us!, whose media-critical leading single "Something About Us", penned by band member Petruo, became the group's third non-consecutive number-one hit in Austria and Germany within a period of 16 months. Further singles released from the album included Latin pop ballad "Still in Love with You", which reached the top five and was awarded a NRJ Music Award the following year, as well as Mousse T.-produced funk track "Let's Go to Bed", the band's first release to miss the German top ten.

"Something About Us" (2002)
The first single from Now... Us!.

Following an exclusive swing concert at the Berlin Tränenpalast in October, No Angels soon followed with a DVD and a live album, titled When the Angels Swing, featuring their biggest hits and selected songs from their first two albums, re-arranged by Grammy Award-nominated jazz musician Till Brönner. Critically acclaimed by critics, the album reached number nine of the German Albums Chart, eventually going gold. In November, the girls embarked on their second national concert tour, the Four Seasons Tour, playing sell-out shows in theatres across German-speaking Europe. Acts such as B3 and the Sugababes served as their support.

Soon after the girls experienced a bit of turbulence when Jessica Wahls announced she was taking a break from the band to give birth to her first child. Although the girls agreed on Jessica's return the following year and Wahls was positive of a re-join after her daughter's birth in March 2003, No Angels' management eventually decided on her departure in July 2003 as the group had equally successful went on as a quartet. While the singer accepted a recording contract as a solo artist with the group's label, Sandy Mölling later noted Jessica's pregnancy marked "the beginning of the end of No Angels".

=== 2003–2004: Pure era and disbandment ===
In early 2003, the remaining four members of No Angels began intensifying work on their third regular album. Encouraged to exercise more self-control on the longplayer, the band took over responsibility in recording and selecting songs to guarantee a more personal effort — a step that challenged criticism and growing scepticism among the band's label Cheyenne Records and recording company Polydor. Titled Pure, the album was eventually released in August 2003 and became the band's third number-one album in Germany. Sporting a more mature side of pop music, it earned them their best reactions yet, drawing comparisons to Madonna's album Ray of Light (1998) as well as other female groups such as All Saints and the Sugababes. With a total of about 150,000 copies sold however, it failed to achieve the success of its two best-selling predecessors, still going gold. The pop rock-influenced leading single "No Angel (It's All in Your Mind)" became the group's fourth non-consecutive number-one single in Germany and seventh top ten hit in Austria, while mediterran "Someday" and R&B-driven "Feelgood Lies" both reached the top five of the charts.

Further planned single releases off the album never materialised. On 7 September 2003, the quartet announced that they would not come together for a new No Angels project in 2004 due to lasting exhaustion and instead were preparing their official disbandment towards the end of the year. While the media began a never-ending speculation about the reasons for their split and the pro and contra of a "creative pause", the girls and their management arranged the cancellation of all dates of their scheduled 2004 Pure Acoustic Tour. Even so, the band agreed on releasing a final album, The Best of No Angels, in December 2003. Apart from a collection of all singles, the band had released between the years of 2001 and 2003, the compilation album also contained a reworked version of one of the debut album tracks, "Reason". Involving a re-joined Jessica Wahls, it was released as the band's final single before their split and became another top ten success for the group. A charity single featuring the band's vocals, "Do They Know It's Christmas?", was released simultaneously and reached number three on the German singles chart.

After a farewell concert in the Munich Olympiahalle on 28 November, several promotional television appearances, and a private unplugged performance in the Munich P1 club on 12 December 2003, No Angels each went their separate ways, concentrating on their individual solo careers in music, theatre, television and film. A live compilation of their P1 concert, titled Acoustic Angels, would become their final release on the Cheyenne label in July 2004.

=== 2006–2008: First reunion and Eurovision Song Contest ===
In the spring of 2006, Lucy Diakovska initiated contact with her former bandmates with the aim of reuniting the group. While Vanessa Petruo declined the invitation in order to continue pursuing her solo career in music and film, Sandy Mölling, Nadja Benaissa, and Jessica Wahls agreed to the proposal on the condition that they could first fulfill their existing solo commitments. The reunited members began working on new material in secrecy, preparing for a potential comeback. Although former manager and Popstars producer Holger Roost-Macias expressed interest in collaborating with the group again, the quartet opted to move forward independently. They secured the rights to the band's name that were previously held by Roost-Macias and subsequently signed an artist contract with the Domestic Division of Universal Music Germany. In the summer of 2006, Benaissa, Diakovska, Mölling and Wahls appeared as guest judges on Popstars – Neue Engel braucht das Land, the fifth season of Popstars.

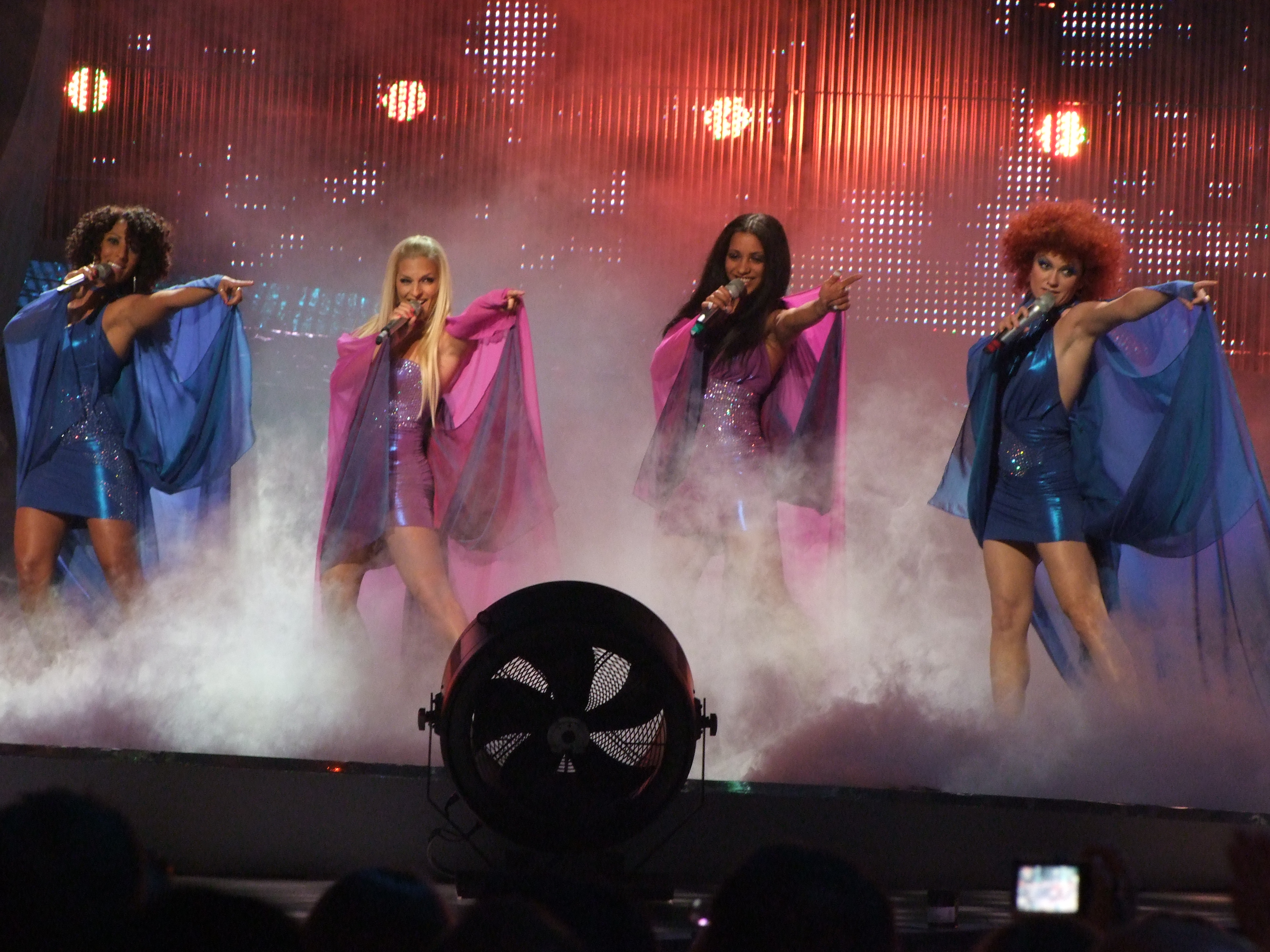
No Angels during their performance at the Eurovision Song Contest finals on 24 May 2008 in Belgrade, Serbia

Following several weeks of public speculation regarding a potential reunion, an official press conference held on 31 January 2007 confirmed that No Angels had officially reformed and were actively working on a new studio album. Despite receiving positive media attention, the reunion struggled to replicate the commercial success and widespread popularity of the band’s earlier years. Their first commercial release in years, Destiny, released in April 2007, received a lukewarm reception from music critics, and debuted at number four in Germany, marking the band’s first regular studio album to miss the top spot. While the album's lead single "Goodbye to Yesterday" still made it to the top five on the German Singles Chart, follow-up "Maybe" and double A-single "Amaze Me"/"Teardrops" underperformed commercially, becoming the band’s lowest-charting singles to date. In March 2008, the album was re-released as Destiny Reloaded, including previously unreleased songs, remixes and B-sides. In fall 2007, No Angels produced the theme song, "Life Is a Miracle" and a music video for the Warner Bros. animated feature Little Dodo.

In January 2008, it was announced that the group had qualified for the Grand Prix Vorentscheid, the German national pre-selection of the Eurovision Song Contest 2008. Following several weeks of promotional appearances, No Angels entered the competition in March with Remee-and-Troelsen-produced "Disappear", competing against all-male groups Marquess and Cinema Bizarre, and singers Tommy Reeve and Carolin Fortenbacher. Widely considered as early favourites by the media, the band eventually finished first, having earned tight 50,5% of the audience vote over Fortenbacher in the second and final election round. Released on 29 February 2008, "Disappear" reached number four in Germany, where it became the band's biggest-selling single in years. With Germany being one of the biggest financial contributors to the European Broadcasting Union, No Angels were allowed to skip the contest's semi-finals and automatically qualified for competition with 24 other countries in the finals of the ESC in May 2008. An estimated 100 million fans watched the final contest, and viewers from all 43 participating nations voted for their favourite performers via text message and telephone. No Angels eventually ranked 23rd place out of the 25 countries that participated with a total of 14 points – taking 12 points from Bulgaria, band member Lucy Diakovska's native country, and 2 points from Switzerland only. Only the United Kingdom and Poland placed below the four-member female band.

=== 2009–2011: Welcome to the Dance ===
Devastated by their performance at the Eurovision Song Contest, the band abandoned plans for recording sessions immediately following the competition and subsequently went on hiatus.. Having managed themselves since their reformation, they signed a deal with Khalid Schröder's Kool Management in mid-2008, and started work on their fifth studio album Welcome to the Dance, involving a smaller team of North American musicians such as The Writing Camp, Adam Messinger, Nasri Atweh, Bill Blast, and Aaron Pearce. Taking the group's work further into the dance and electronic genres, it was released on 11 September 2009, following several delays after band member Nadja Benaissa's charge of grievous bodily harm and temporary imprisonment in April 2010. Released to generally mixed reviews by critics, the album debuted at number 26 in Germany where it became both the band's lowest-charting and -selling album yet. Welcome to the Dance's first and only single "One Life", however, reached number 15 on the German Singles Chart. Plans for a second single, "Derailed", were eventually scrapped for unknown reasons.

In May 2010, the band began their five-date acoustic An Intimate Evening With Tour in Munich, their first concert tour in eight years. The stripped-down club tour was inspired by their 2003 acoustic concert, and saw the band performing songs from all of their five studio albums. Benaissa did not take part in the tour as she had called in sick a week before, prompting the remaining trio to re-arrange their set at the last minute. Generally well received by the media, the tour was initially said to be extended in 2011. In September 2010, Benaissa announced her departure from the group following her two-year suspended sentence and 300 hours of community service a month before, leaving the band as a trio. While the remaining three members of the band were said to release a live album in 2011, this project and other plans announced for the tenth anniversary of the band failed to materialize in favor of individual solo projects. In 2014, Diakovska confirmed that the band had dissolved again with no new commercial projects planned.

=== 2020–2022: Second reunion and 20 ===
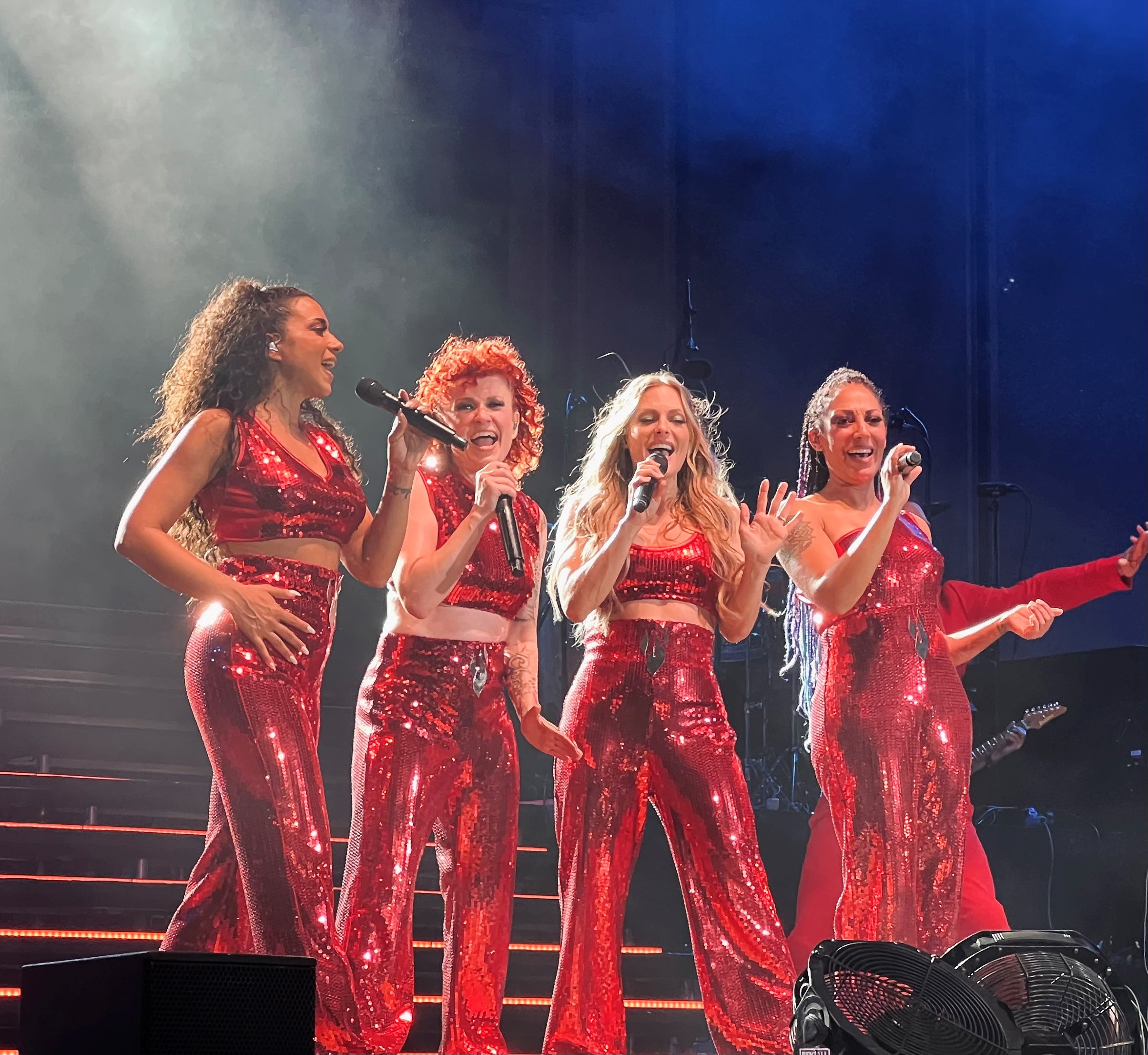
No Angels during their Celebration Tour kick-off at the Parkbühne Wuhlheide in Berlin in June 2022

Following the death of Diakovska's mother in February 2020, Benaissa, Diakovska, Mölling, and Wahls reconnected after several years, which led to initial considerations regarding the 20th anniversary of No Angels. In 2020, BMG Rights Management acquired the catalog of the band's former label Cheyenne Records. On 27 November 2020, following their absence from digital streaming platforms for five years, No Angels' backup catalog from 2000 to 2004 was issued online, accompanied by a digital campaign as well as the release of high-quality versions of their original music videos. Released to strong streaming numbers, a revived interest from the media and their fan base prompted Benaissa, Diakovska, Mölling and Wahls to launch an official Instagram account through which they began sharing private photos and hosted several livestreams in the weeks following. With BMG interested in issuing updated versions of their early catalog, the quartet re-formed in January 2021 to record new vocals for a Celebration Version of "Daylight in Your Eyes" along with producer and manager Christian Geller. Commemorating with the 2001 release of the song, it was released on 12 February 2021 and reached the top ten of the German Download Chart.

Following their first performance in a decade on Schlagerchampions 2021, the quartet signed a new recording deal with BMG and began work on 20, their first full-length album release since 2009, with plans to expand the anniversary celebrations. Released on 4 June 2021, No Angels recorded four original songs and sixteen updated versions of songs that were selected from their first three studio albums for 20. Produced by Geller, the album received largely mixed reviews from critics, some of whom complimented the more cohesive, mature production, while others questioned the overall value of the project. 20 debuted at number one on the German Albums Chart, becoming No Angels' first chart topper in nearly two decades, and reached the top ten in Austria and Switzerland. A second single, the Celebration Version of "Still in Love with You," was released the same month, followed by "Mad Wild" and "When the Angels Sing" in August and October, respectively. Also in October 2021, the band was honored with the Lifetime Achievement Award at the Preis für Popkultur, recognizing their lasting impact and significant contributions to the pop music scene. In June 2022, the band kicked off their Celebration Tour at the Parkbühne Wuhlheide. Continued in September 2022, the tour compromised ten concerts throughout Germany and concluded on 8 October 2022. The Berlin concert was subsequently nominated the following year in the Most Impressive Live Show category at the 2023 Preis für Popkultur.

=== 2023–present: 25th anniversary celebrations and It's Christmas ===
In 2023 and 2024, No Angels reunited for select festival concerts and one-off events, including a special guest appearance on German hip hop group K.I.Z's International Women's Day concert at the Mercedes-Benz Arena in March 2003. In January 2024, they revealed plans to record a new album, with sessions taking place between July and August under producer Christian Geller. As part of their 25th anniversary celebrations, the group launched the Still in Love with You – Summer 2025 festival tour, running from June to October 2025 and earning praise for its energetic, nostalgic shows. In October 2025, they released the single "I Still Believe," the theme for the 30th RTL-Spendenmarathon, which also served as the lead single from their eighth studio album It's Christmas, their first Christmas album, recorded the previous year. Released in November 2025 via Geller's Stars by Edel label, the album debuted at number ten on the German Albums Chart, marking their eighth top-ten record in Germany.

No Angels performing during their TwentyFive Live 2026 tour in Porta Westfalica in July 2026.

In April 2026, No Angels appeared on the ProSieben television show Staying Alive, in which they performed duets with deceased musicians such as Whitney Houston, Amy Winehouse, Elvis, and Freddie Mercury through the use of AI-generated vocals and visuals. Despite failing to attract a large television audience and receiving mixed to negative reviews, with critics particularly questioning its use of AI and the technical execution of the digital likenesses, the band's performances of songs such as "I Will Always Love You" and "Bohemian Rhapsody" elicited positive reactions. In June, the band launched their TwentyFive Live 2026 festival tour in celebration of their silver jubilee, following the postponement of the first three shows due to health-related issues. The tour was ultimately reduced to eleven concerts after three additional performances were cancelled at short notice due to production issues. The remaining shows received largely favorable reviews.

The band is expected to appear in the film Der perfekte Urlaub (2026), a sequel to Das perfekte Geheimnis (2019), the German adaptation of the Italian comedy-drama Perfect Strangers (2016). For the film, they also recorded the title song, "Perfect Kind of Us," which was created in collaboration with the film's director and released on 2 October 2026. On 14 October 2026, No Angels – Das sind wir!, a three-part documentary about No Angels produced by Warner Bros. International Television Production for ARD and filmed over the course of a year, is scheduled to premiere on the ARD Mediathek, chronicling the group's formation, rise to fame, and subsequent career. In further promotion of It's Christmas, No Angels are also set to present the album during an exclusive performance on 18 December 2026 at Berlin's Uber Eats Music Hall, accompanied by a live orchestra.

== Discography ==
=== Studio albums ===
- Elle'ments (2001)
- Now... Us! (2002)
- Pure (2003)
- Destiny (2007)
- Welcome to the Dance (2009)
- 20 (2021)
- It's Christmas (2025)

== Tours ==
Concert tours

- Rivers of Joy Tour (2001)
- Four Seasons Tour (2002)
- An Intimate Evening with... No Angels (2010)
- Celebration Tour (2022)

Festival tours

- Still in Love with You – Summer 2025 (2025)
- TwentyFive Live 2026 (2026)

== Awards ==
Year	Award	Category	Nominee(s)	Result	Ref.
2001	1LIVE Krone	Beste Newcomer	No Angels	Won	
2001	Bambi	Pop National	No Angels	Won	
2001	Bravo Otto	Superband Pop (Gold)	No Angels	Won	
2001	Comet	Act National	No Angels	Won	
2001	Comet	Newcomer National	No Angels	Nominated	
2001	Comet	VIVA Zuschauercomet	No Angels	Nominated	
2001	MTV Europe Music Awards	Best German Act	No Angels	Nominated	
2001	Top of the Pops Awards	Top Single Germany	"There Must Be an Angel"	Won	
2002	1LIVE Krone	Beste Band	No Angels	Won	
2002	Amadeus Austrian Music Awards	Single des Jahres (international)	"Daylight in Your Eyes"	Nominated	
2002	Bravo Otto	Superband Pop (Gold)	No Angels	Won	
2002	Comet	VIVA Zuschauercomet	No Angels	Won	
2002	Echo Music Prize	Gruppe Rock/Pop (national)	Elle'ments	Won	
2002	Echo Music Prize	Rock-Pop-Single des Jahres (national)	"Daylight in Your Eyes"	Won	
2002	MTV Europe Music Awards	Best German Act	No Angels	Nominated	
2002	Radio Regenbogen Awards	Aufsteiger des Jahres	No Angels	Won	
2002	World Music Awards	Best Selling German Artist	No Angels	Won	
2003	1LIVE Krone	Beste Singles	"No Angels (It's All in Your Mind)"	Won	
2003	Bravo Otto	Superband Pop (Silver)	No Angels	Won	
2003	Comet	Band National	No Angels	Won	
2003	Echo Music Prize	Gruppe Rock/Pop (national)	Now... Us!	Nominated	
2003	Echo Music Prize	Musikvideo (national)	"Something About Us"	Won	
2003	Echo Music Prize	Rock-Pop-Single des Jahres (national)	"Something About Us"	Nominated	
2003	Goldene Kamera	Pop national	When the Angels Swing	Won	
2003	NRJ Music Awards	Best German Song	"Still in Love with You"	Won	
2007	Bayerischer Musiklöwe	Bestes Comeback	No Angels	Won	
2009	Szenepreis	Song des Jahres (national)	"Disappear"	Won	
2010	Szenepreis	Song des Jahres (national)	"One Life"	Won	
2011	Szenepreis	Persönlichkeit des Jahres	No Angels	Nominated	
2021	Goldene Henne	Musik	No Angels	Nominated	
2021	Preis für Popkultur	Lifetime Achievement Award	No Angels	Won	
2023	Preis für Popkultur	Beeindruckendste Liveshow	20 Celebration – Eine Sommernacht in Berlin	Nominated	

Awards and achievements
Preceded by Roger Cicero with Frauen regier'n die Welt	Germany in the Eurovision Song Contest; 2008	Succeeded by Alex Swings Oscar Sings with Miss Kiss Kiss Bang
