= Life Is a Miracle (song) =

Song by No Angels

from the album Kleiner Dodo soundtrack
- Released: 4 January 2008
- Recorded: 2007
- Studio: Out Now, Cologne-Ehrenfeld, Germany
- Genre: Pop; dance-pop
- Length: 4:02
- Label: Polydor; Universal
- Songwriters: Martin Fliegenschmidt; Michelle Leonard; Frank Kurt Meyer; Dieter Müller-Christ; Claudio Pagonis
- Producers: Out Now Music; Tinseltown

"Life Is a Miracle" is a dance-pop song recorded by the German pop group No Angels as the theme song of the soundtrack for the 2008 Warner Bros. animated feature Kleiner Dodo. Co-written by Martin Fliegenschmidt, Michelle Leonard, Frank Kurt Meyer, Dieter Müller-Christ, Claudio Pagonis, it features production from Tinseltown and Out Now Music.

== Release and reception ==
The song was written specifically for the Kleiner Dodo film by Tinseltown and Out Now Music, who composed the music, with lyrics from British songwriter Michelle Leonard. The theme was then recorded by all-female pop band No Angels, whose version is played during the closing credits. "Every song, we decide to pick up is something special [...] and it was fun to record [the track] because it has such a great refrain [...]," band member Jessica Wahls told during an interview with HiB on the red carpet of the film premiere in Cologne. A music video for the song was released via internet to promote the film and its soundtrack. The video consists of No Angels performing in the recording booth, as well as various clips of scenes from throughout the film.
