= No Angel (It's All in Your Mind) =

2003 single by No Angels

Single by No Angels

from the album Pure
- Released: 22 April 2003
- Studio: Department (Frankfurt)
- Length: 3:14
- Label: Cheyenne; Polydor
- Songwriters: Pete Kirtley; Tim Hawes; Liz Winstanley
- Producers: Perky Park; Nik Hafemann

No Angels singles chronology
"All Cried Out" (2002)	"No Angel (It's All in Your Mind)" (2003)	"Someday" (2003)

"No Angel (It's All in Your Mind)" is a song by German pop band No Angels. It was written by Pete Kirtley, Tim Hawes and Liz Winstanley for the group's third studio album, Pure (2003), while production was helmed by Nik Hafemann along with Arno Kammermeier, Peter Hayo, and Walter Merziger who are credited under their production moniker Perky Park. The mid-tempo pop track incorporates minor pop rock and soft rock elements; the song's instrumentation includes drums and guitars. Lyrically, it deals with picture-perfect illusions in a relationship.

The song was released as the album's lead single along with a cover version of Dutch rock band Shocking Blue's "Venus" (1969) on 22 April 2003 in German-speaking Europe. "No Angel (It's All in Your Mind)" marked the group's first release without fifth band member Jessica Wahls following her break from the band due to maternity. Commercially, the single was an instant success: It debuted at number-one on the German Singles Chart, the group's fourth single to do so. It also peaked at number ten in Austria and reached number seven on a composite European Hot 100 Singles chart.

The accompanying music video was directed by Marcus Sternberg, and features the girls in a warehouse-type building that was inspired by Andy Warhol's Silver Clouds art installation and its large helium-filled, pillow-like forms made from silver plastic film. Each member of the band is also shown on other locations, following several story lines. "No Angel (It's All in Your Mind)" was promoted through numerous live appearances, including its world premiere at the Bravo Super Show on 8 March 2003 as well as performances on Top of the Pops and Interaktiv.

== Background ==
After band member Jessica Wahls' pregnancy break from the group after the end of the Four Seasons Tour, the remaining four members of No Angels began intensifying work on their then-untitled third studio album. Encouraged to exercise more self-control on the longplayer after their critically acclaimed contribution to predecessor Now... Us!, the band took over responsibility in composing, recording and selecting songs to guarantee a more personal theme on the album — a step that challenged criticism and growing scepticism among the band's label Cheyenne Records and recording company Polydor. "No Angel (It's All in Your Mind)" was written by Pete Kirtley and Tim Hawes from British production team Jiant along with songwriter Liz Winstanley. Production was overseen by trio Perky Park, consisting of Arno Kammermeier, Peter Hayo, and Walter Merziger, and Nik Hafemann for Cheyenne Records. Thomas Blug played the guitar, while mixing was handled by Park. All vocals were recorded at the Weryton Studios in Munich, with Hafemann also serving as vocal producer and arranger.

== Release and reception ==
Selected as the album's leading single by the group's records company, physical singles of "No Angel (It's All in Your Mind)" were issued on 22 April 2003 by Cheyenne Records. The maxi single includes several remixes of the song, including a Video Mix and a Rock Version, as well as two versions of the band's rendition of Dutch rock band Shocking Blue's 1969 song "Venus." Written by Robbie van Leeuwen and produced by frequent collaborator Thorsten Brötzmann, No Angels initially recorded "Venus" for the commercials of Gillette's Women Venus Passion razors division. Critical reception towards "No Angel (It's All in Your Mind)" was generally positive, with CDstarts calling it "very best radio feed."

Upon release, "No Angel (It's All in Your Mind)" peaked and debuted at number one on the German Singles Chart in the week ending 5 May 2003. It became the band's fourth non-consecutive chart topper in Germany after "Daylight in Your Eyes" (2001), "There Must Be an Angel" (2001) and "Something About Us" (2002). The song spent one week at the top of chart and remained another eight weeks within the top 75. It was eventually ranked 73rd on the national year-end chart. In Austria, "No Angel (It's All in Your Mind)" reached number ten, making it their sixth and final top ten single. It remained four weeks within the top twenty, and spent eleven weeks on the Austrian Singles Chart. In Switzerland, the song had a peak position of number forty-six. On Billboard's composite European Hot 100 Singles, it peaked and debuted at number seven.

== Music video ==
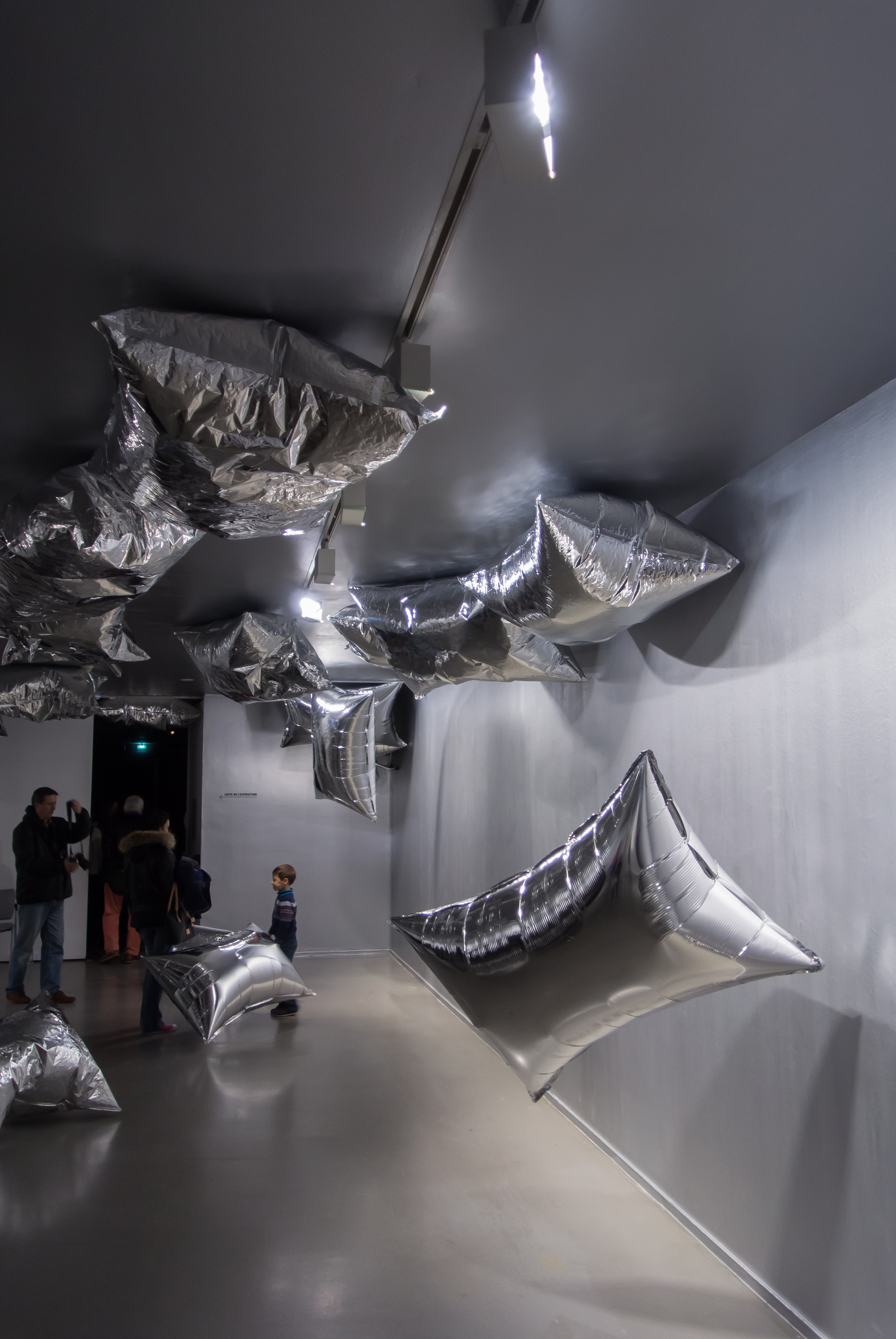
Visuals in "No Angel" were inspired by Andy Warhol and his Silver Clouds art installation (pictured).

An accompanying music video for "No Angel (It's All in Your Mind)" was directed and produced by German music video director Marcus Sternberg for Marcus Sternberg Filmproduktion. His fourth collaboration with the band, filming took place in a warehouse-type loft in Berlin-Tempelhof on 22 March 2003 and lasted 17 hours. Thomas Wedekind served as Sternberg's assistant, with Rüdiger Schwarz acting as camera and boom operator. Martin Lieckfeld was hired as lightning technician, while Volker Rehm was consulted as production designer. Based on an idea by Sternberg, the visuals in the video were inspired by American artist Andy Warhol's visual art movement, especially by his Silver Clouds art installation which consists of large helium-filled, pillow-like forms made from silver plastic film. Thus, most scenes feature heavy late-1960s fashion and pop art images.

Throughout the video, each member is seen interacting with a man who films her with a hand camera. Only Nadja Benaissa acts as a cinematographer herself, who in turn films a topless dancer. The first verse is sung by a curly-haired Sandy Mölling, who is filmed while performing in a narrow corridor made of fluorescent tubes at either side of her. Vanessa Petruo is seen dancing in front of a sitting man in a tin foil covered room with a light bulb dangling from the ceiling. Lucy Diakovska is wearing a short dark sequin dress and is posing for a photographer against a silver brick wall, with lights pointed at her. Finally, Benaissa is sitting in an opulent wicker chair while a man is dancing in the window light behind her. During the instrumental break, the quartet is seen throwing helium-filled, pillow-like balloons around. Towards the end of the video, the members of No Angels are lined up in black clothes with microphones in front of them, and finish off with a basic dance routine.

== Track listings ==
CD maxi single
No.	Title	Writer(s)	Producer(s)	Length
1.	"No Angel (It's All in Your Mind)" (Radio Version)	Pete Kirtley; Tim Hawes; Liz Winstanley	Perky Park; Nik Hafemann	3:12
2.	"No Angel (It's All in Your Mind)" (Video Mix)	Kirtley; Hawes; Winstanley	Park; Hafemann	3:23
3.	"No Angel (It's All in Your Mind)" (Rock Version)	Kirtley; Hawes; Winstanley	Park; Hafemann	3:14
4.	"Venus" (Main Version)	Robbie van Leeuwen	Thorsten Brötzmann; Jeo^{[a]}	2:53
5.	"Venus" (House Version)	Leeuwen	Brötzmann; Jeo^{[a]}	3:00

Notes

- ^{^a} denotes co-producer

== Credits and personnel ==
Credits adapted from the liner notes of Pure.

- Production – Perky Park, Nik Hafemann
- Vocal production – Nik Hafemann
- Guitar – Thomas Blug
- Mixing – Jeo
- Supervising producer – Nik Hafemann

== Charts ==
=== Weekly charts ===
Weekly chart performance for "No Angel (It's All in Your Mind)"
Chart (2003)	Peak position
Austria (Ö3 Austria Top 40)	10
Europe (Eurochart Hot 100)	7
Germany (GfK)	1
Switzerland (Schweizer Hitparade)	46

=== Year-end charts ===
Year-end chart performance for "No Angel (It's All in Your Mind)"
Chart (2003)	Position
Germany (GfK)	73

== Release history ==
Release dates and formats for "No Angel (It's All in Your Mind)"
Region	Date	Format	Label	Ref.
Various	22 April 2003	CD maxi single; digital download	Cheyenne; Polydor	

== See also ==
- Number-one hits of 2003 (Germany)
