= Four Seasons Tour =

2002 concert tour by No Angels

- Tour by No Angels
- Promotional poster for the Hamburg concert
- Associated album: Now... Us!
- Start date: 7 November 2002
- End date: 3 December 2002
- No. of shows: 19

No Angels concert chronology
- Rivers of Joy Tour (2001); Four Seasons Tour (2002); An Intimate Evening with... No Angels (2010)

The Four Seasons Tour is a 2002 concert tour by German female pop group No Angels, organized to promote their second studio album Now... Us! (2002).

== Reception ==
Local online magazine ka-news declared the concert "the perfect show and added: "The mixture of elaborate dance interludes and sensitive ballads rushed through the Europahalle, so that even the floor thumped with it. The five girls did their thing properly, sorting the songs according to the four seasons." In her review of the concert at the Alsterdorfer Sporthalle in Hamburg, Hamburger Abendblatt writer Conni Schierer called the show "a colorful party."eine kunterbunte party."

== Opening acts ==
- B3
- Maja
- Pierre Humphrey
- She'Loe
- Sugababes
- Tears

== Set list ==
1. "Three Words"
2. "100% Emotional"
3. "2 Get Over U"
4. "Since I Found U" (Vanessa solo)
5. "Still in Love with You"
6. "Lost in You"
7. "Like Ice in the Sunshine"
8. "Come Back" (Nadja solo)
9. "Autumn Breeze
10. "There Must Be an Angel"
11. "Shield Against My Sorrow" (Jessica solo)
12. "Let's Go to Bed"
13. "Rivers of Joy"
14. "Say Goodbye" (Sandy solo)
15. "Stay" (Lucy solo)
16. "Lovestory"
17. "Something About Us"

Encore

18. "All Cried Out"
19. "Daylight in Your Eyes"

Notes

- "Shield Against My Sorrow" was not performed in Zürich and Vienna.

== Tour dates ==
List of concerts
Date	City	Country	Venue
7 November 2002	Bayreuth	Germany	Oberfrankenhalle
9 November 2002	Grefrath	Germany	Eissporthalle
11 November 2002	Düsseldorf	Germany	Mitsubishi Electric Halle
10 November 2002	Karlsruhe	Germany	Europahalle
12 November 2002	Berlin	Germany	Treptow Arena
13 November 2002	Hannover	Germany	Niedersachsenhalle
15 November 2002	Böblingen	Germany	Sporthalle
16 November 2002	Zürich	Switzerland	Hallenstadion
17 November 2002	Munich	Germany	Olympiahalle
20 November 2002	Dortmund	Germany	Westfalenhalle
21 November 2002	Hamburg	Germany	Alsterdorfer Sporthalle
23 November 2002	Kiel	Germany	Ostseehalle
25 November 2002	Freiburg	Germany	Messehalle
26 November 2002	Mannheim	Germany	Mannheimer Rosengarten
27 November 2002	Ulm	Germany	Donau Arena
29 November 2002	Leipzig	Germany	Messehalle
30 November 2002	Frankfurt	Germany	Jahrhunderthalle
1 December 2002	Göttingen	Germany	Lokhalle
3 December 2002	Vienna	Austria	Gasometer
