= Lucy Diakovska =

Bulgarian and German singer (born 1976)

- Люси Дяковска
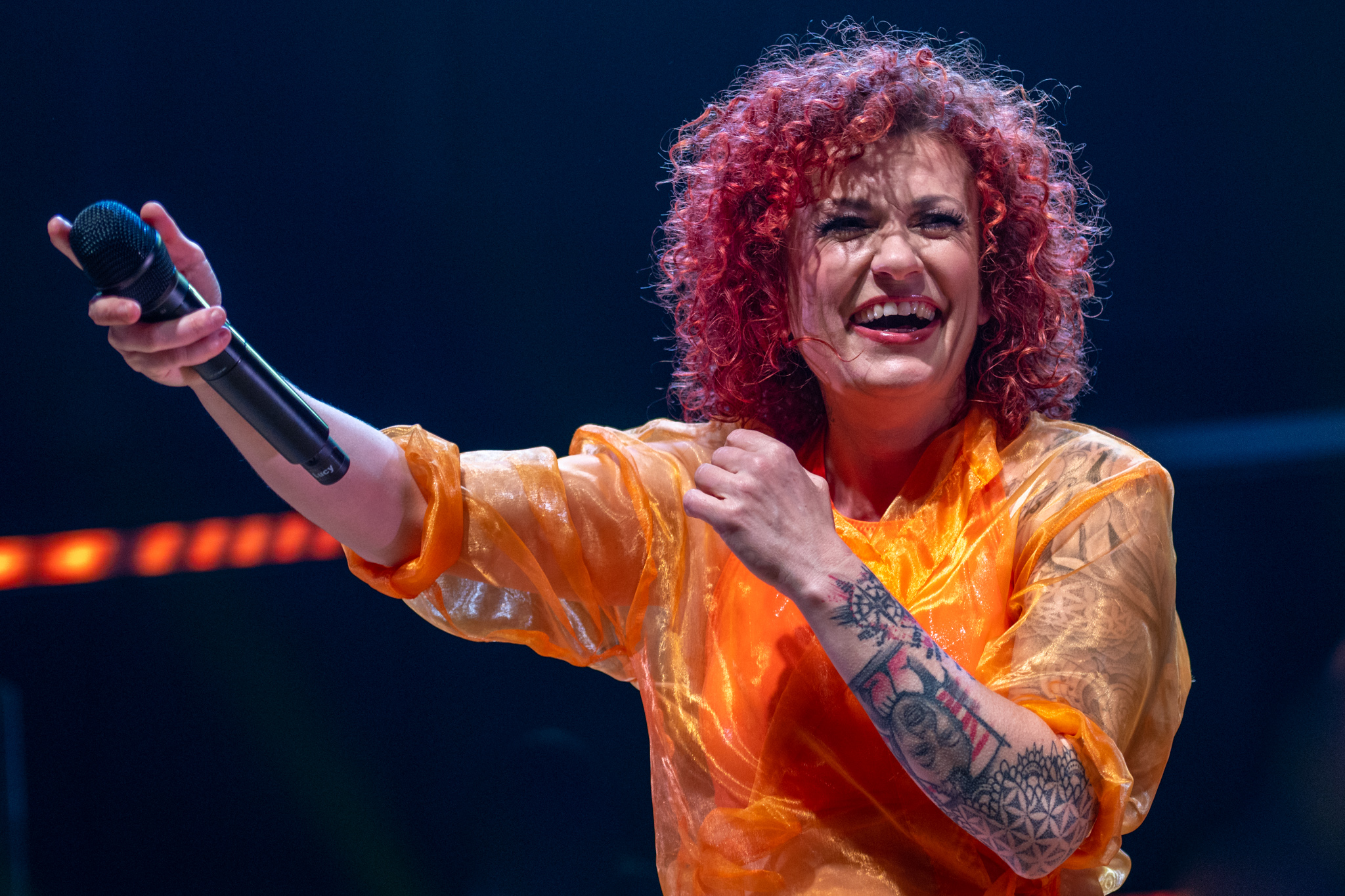
- Diakovska performing in 2022
- Born: Lyudmila Lyubomirova Dyakovska; 2 April 1976 (age 50); Pleven, Bulgaria
- Other names: Lucy; Lucylicious
- Occupations: Singer; television personality
- Years active: 1997–present
- Works: Solo discography; No Angels discography
- Musical career
- Genres: Pop; electropop
- Labels: Island; Edel
- Member of: No Angels

Lyudmila Lyubomirova Dyakovska (Bulgarian: Людмила Любомирова Дяковска; born 2 April 1976), better known as Lucy Diakovska (Bulgarian: Люси Дяковска), is a Bulgarian and German singer and television personality. She rose to prominence as one of the founding members of the all-female pop band No Angels, the "biggest-selling German girlband to date", according to the German media.

After a series of commercially successful releases with the group, Diakovska released two singles and her solo album The Other Side under her same-titled stage name in 2005. In 2008, she became part of the jury on reality shows Music Idol and Starmania, the Bulgarian and Austrian version of the Idol series respectively, and later joined the jury of the German version of Popstars in 2012. In the 2010s and 2020s she remained active as a television personality, stage performer and concert soloist in Germany and Bulgaria, appearing in formats including X Factor Bulgaria, The Masked Singer and Ich bin ein Star – Holt mich hier raus!, and in symphonic crossover projects with Bulgarian orchestras.

== Early life ==
Diakovska is the oldest child of Lubomir Diakovski, an opera singer, and Rositza Diakovska, a pianist. Her younger brother named Alexander (b. 1982) is a professional basketball player. Her grandfather is a famous Bulgarian folk composer. Her family moved to Germany.

At the age of six she got her first stage performance at a local opera house and in the following years she trained herself in singing and dancing. After her high school graduation in 1994 Diakovska decided to move to Germany to get trained at the Stage School of Music, Dance and Drama in Hamburg. At the same time she worked as a dancer for the musical Buddy, where she even got hold of a recurring role a little later.

== Career ==
=== No Angels ===
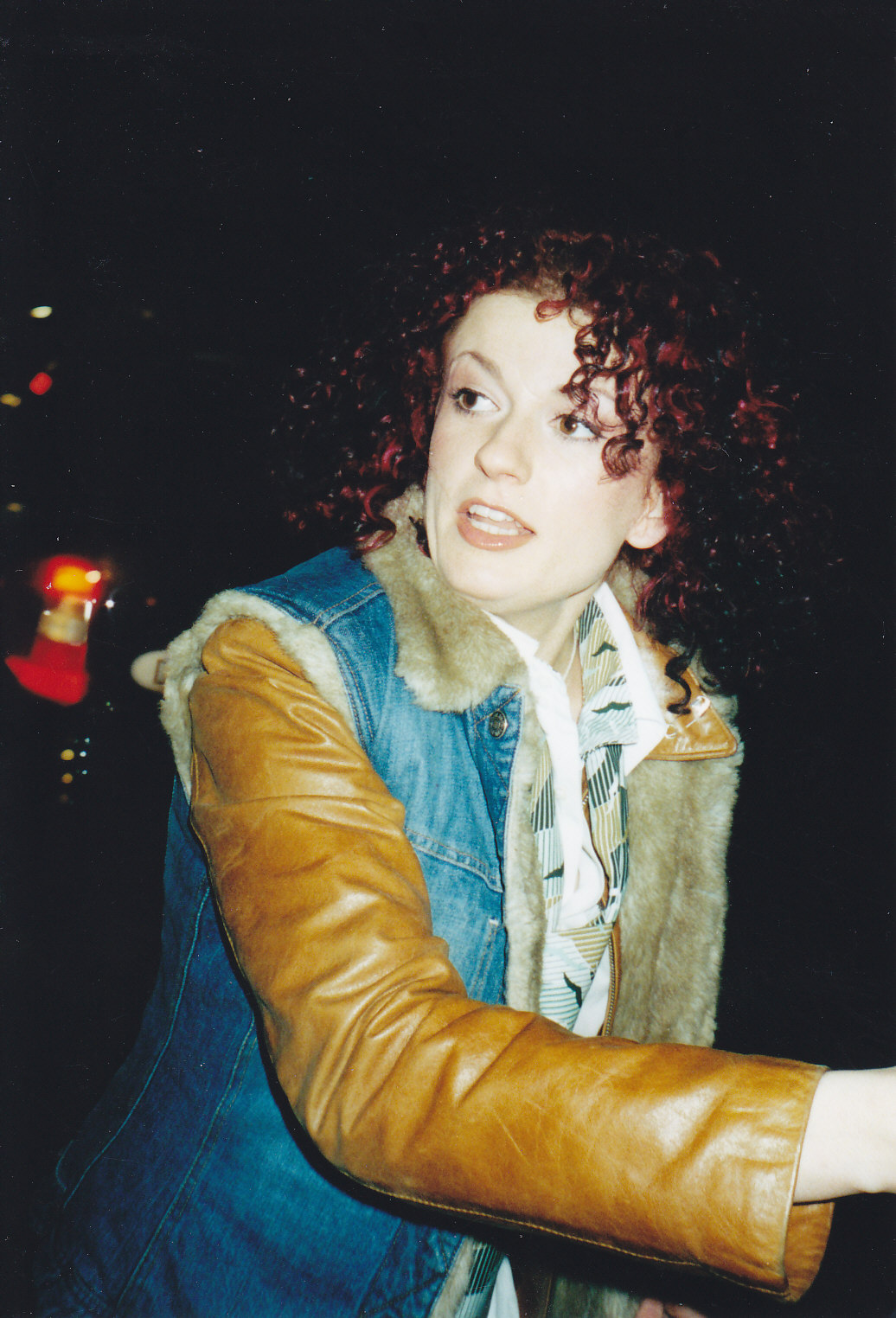
Diakovska in 2002

Encouraged to try her luck in the professional music business, Diakovska decided to audition for the 2000 debut of the German reality television program Popstars. She entered the competition with thousands of other women, and the judges, Simone Angel, Rainer Moslener and Mario M. Mendrzycki, were impressed with her performance in Hamburg. She earned a position in the top thirty finalists and immediately travelled to Mallorca, Spain to join her competitors for a workshop there. In the end Diakovska made it to the final ten on the show, and during a special episode in November 2000, jury member Moslener disclosed that she was chosen to become part of the final girl group No Angels.

With the final five members of the band in place, Popstars continued tracking the development and struggles of the group who left homes to move into a shared flat near Munich. However, it took another four months until the band released their debut single "Daylight in Your Eyes", which would subsequently appear on the band's debut album Elle'ments (2001). Both the single and the album became an unexpected but record-breaking success, when both instantly entered the top position on the Austrian, German and Swiss Media Control singles, albums and airplay charts, making No Angels one of the most successful debuts in years.

In the following years No Angels released another two number-one studio albums, Now ... Us! and Pure, a live album and a successful swing album branded When the Angels Swing, totalling twelve singles altogether – including four-number one singles. Eventually selling more than five million singles and albums worldwide, No Angels became the best-selling German girl band to date and the most successful girl group of continental Europe between the years of 2001 and 2003. On 5 September 2003, the four remaining members of the band (Jessica Wahls had left the band following the birth of her first child in February 2003) announced that they would no longer be performing together after three years of continual touring and increasing cases of illness. The release of The Best of No Angels in November of the same year marked the end of the band, with each member going their separate ways in early 2004.

Diakovska re-joined No Angels after the group's revival. In March 2008 they were selected to represent Germany at the Eurovision Song Contest 2008 finals in Belgrade in May. She, however, was not the first Bulgarian to represent Germany in the Eurovision finals. In 1964 this was done by Nora Nova.

In 2021, No Angels reunited for the twentieth anniversary of their debut single and released a new "Celebration Version" of "Daylight in Your Eyes". The group also released the album 20, which entered the German album chart at number one in June 2021. The release was followed by the group's Celebration Tour in 2022.

=== Television, stage and Bulgarian projects ===
In 2015, Diakovska returned to Bulgarian television as a judge and mentor on the fourth season of X Factor Bulgaria. She continued to appear in entertainment formats in the following years, including as a guest artist on the Bulgarian show Peesh ili luzhesh in 2016 and as the Oktopus on the first season of the German edition of The Masked Singer in 2019.

Alongside her television work, Diakovska remained active in staged and symphonic crossover productions in Bulgaria. In 2019 she took part in The Best of Andrew Lloyd Webber, a concert production with the Sofia Philharmonic, Pleven Philharmonic and the National Philharmonic Choir. She also appeared in Opera Plovdiv's production of Astor Piazzolla's María de Buenos Aires, described by the company as the Bulgarian premiere of the work.

In 2023 she and Militsa Gladnishka were soloists in ABBA Symphonie, a national tour with Pleven Philharmonic which included concerts in Stara Zagora, Nessebar, Burgas, Plovdiv, Sofia, Veliko Tarnovo, Varna and Silistra. The project presented songs by ABBA in symphonic arrangements for Bulgarian audiences, with Pleven Philharmonic, Militsa Gladnishka, conductor Nayden Todorov and pianist, arranger and co-conductor Georgi Miltiyadov among its principal participants.

In the same period Diakovska developed business and civic activities in her native Pleven. In 2021 she became associated with the relaunch and management of Park Hotel Kaylaka, a hotel complex in the Kaylaka protected area which was renovated in the same year.

In 2024, Diakovska was a contestant on the seventeenth season of the German reality television series Ich bin ein Star – Holt mich hier raus!. The RTL format was filmed in the Australian bush and she became the winner of the season in February 2024.

== Personal life ==
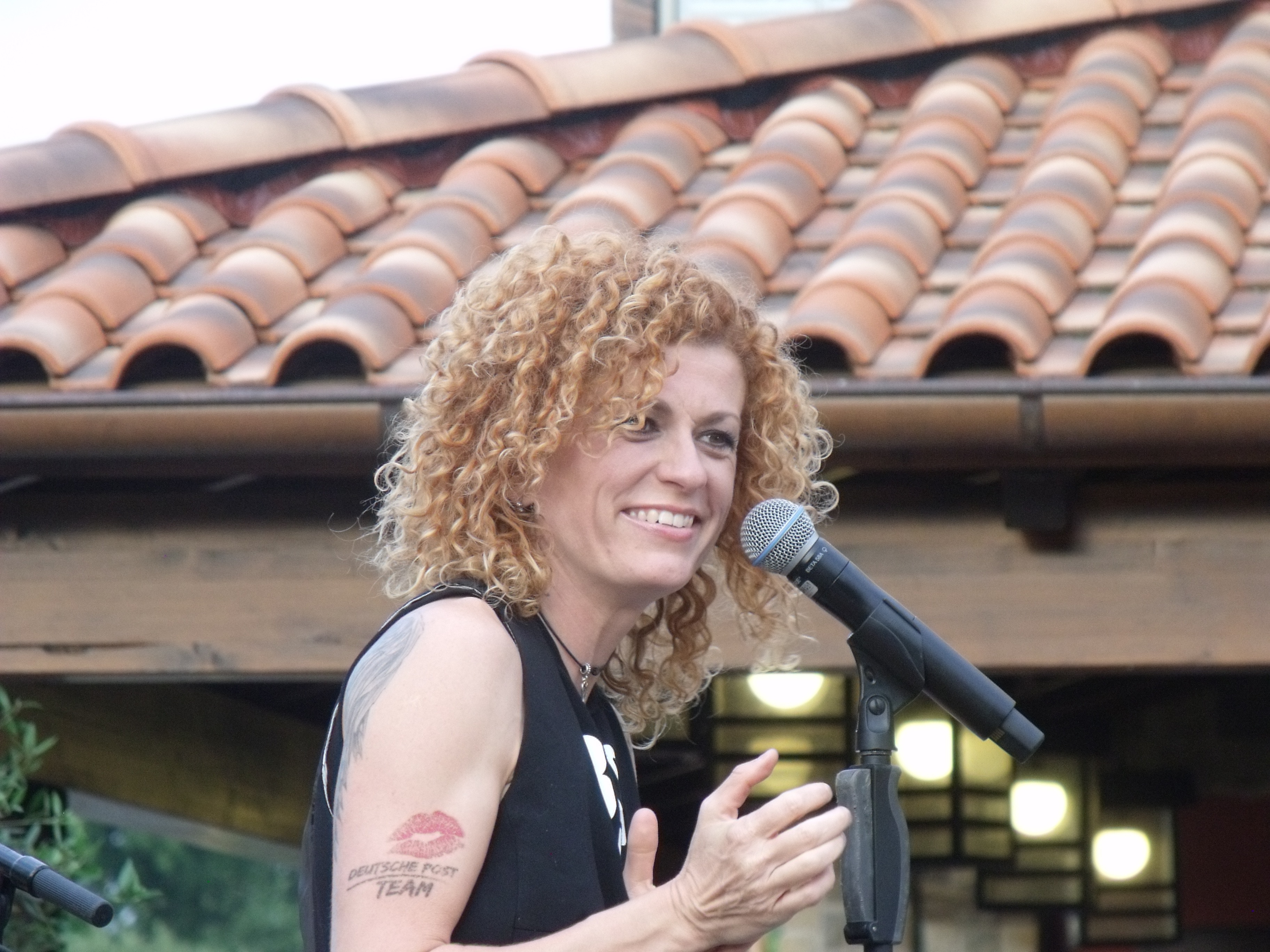
Diakovska in 2015

Diakovska publicly came out as lesbian during the fourth season of the Bulgarian reality show VIP Brother.

== Filmography ==
- Peesh ili luzhesh (season 1, guest artist)
- X Factor Bulgaria (season 4, judge and mentor)
- The Masked Singer (season 1, contestant as Oktopus)
- Ich bin ein Star – Holt mich hier raus! (season 17, winner)

== Discography ==
=== Albums ===
| Title | Album details | Peak chart positions | | |
| Title | Album details | GER | AUT | SWI |
|---|---|---|---|---|
| The Other Side | Released: 5 September 2005; Label: Schmanky, Edel; Formats: CD, digital download | 84 | — | — |

=== Singles ===
| Title | Year | Peak positions | | | Album |
| Title | Year | GER | AUT | SWI | Album |
|---|---|---|---|---|---|
| "Where" | 2004 | 60 | — | — | non-album release |
| "The Other Side" | 2005 | 68 | — | — | The Other Side |
| "Misunderstood" | 2005 | — | — | — | The Other Side |
| "Ja lublu tebja heißt Ich liebe dich" | 2015 | — | — | — | non-album release |
| "Laufen durch die Stadt" | 2016 | — | — | — | non-album release |
| "Liebe ist alles" (with BANGERS & Marcella Rockefeller) | 2022 | — | — | — | non-album release |
"—" denotes a recording that did not chart or was not released in that territory.

=== Album appearances ===
- 2004: "The Wish"
- 2005: "Chiquitita"
- 2009: "Ich wart' auf dich, mein Prinz"
- 2010: "High on Life"
