= Thorsten Brötzmann =

- Origin: Germany
- Genres: Pop, Pop rock, World music
- Occupations: Record producer, composer, arranger
- Website: TBMusik.de

Thorsten Brötzmann is a German record producer, composer, and arranger. He collaborated with No Angels, Bro'Sis, Christina Stürmer, Monrose, Jeanette, Nina Kraljić, Oonagh, Alexander Klaws, and Modern Talking.

== Selected production discography ==
=== Number-one singles ===
Year	Title	Artist
2000	"Leb!"	Die 3. Generation
2001	"Daylight in Your Eyes"	No Angels
2002	"Something About Us"	No Angels
2003	"No Angel (It's All in Your Mind)"/"Venus"	No Angels
2006	"Nie genug"	Christina Stürmer
2006	"Um bei Dir zu sein"	Christina Stürmer
2007	"Ein Stern (…der deinen Namen trägt)"	DJ Ötzi featuring Nik P.
