= An Intimate Evening with... No Angels =

2010 concert tour by No Angels

- Tour by No Angels
- Promotional poster for the tour
- Location: Germany
- Associated album: Welcome to the Dance
- Start date: 17 May 2010
- End date: 22 May 2010
- No. of shows: 5

No Angels concert chronology
- Four Seasons Tour (2002); An Intimate Evening with... No Angels (2010); Celebration Tour (2022)

An Intimate Evening with... No Angels was the third concert tour by German pop band No Angels. Mounted in support of their fifth studio album, Welcome to the Dance (2009), it marked the group's first concert tour since the 2002 Four Seasons Tour and their only tour during their first reunion phase, which began in 2007. Drawing on the acoustic concept originally developed for the cancelled 2004 Pure Acoustic Tour, a planned acoustic tour supporting Pure (2003) and cancelled following the group's decision to disband in late 2003, the five-date club tour took place in May 2010, beginning at Munich's Atomic Café.

The tour got off to a turbulent start when Nadja Benaissa withdrew for health reasons just four days before the opening date. Her absence became a major focus of the tour's advance publicity and media coverage. Nevertheless, all scheduled concerts went ahead, with the setlist and arrangements reworked at short notice to accommodate the group performing as a trio. Reviews were largely positive, with critics highlighting the stripped-back presentation, strong vocal performances, energetic delivery, and musical versatility, while also noting the retrospective and nostalgic character of the setlist.

== Background ==
Originally a quintet, consisting of Nadja Benaissa, Lucy Diakovska, Sandy Mölling, Vanessa Petruo, and Jessica Wahls, No Angels were formed formed in 2000 during the debut season of the German adaptation of the talent series Popstars and quickly became one of the most commercially successful pop acts of the 2000s. Their first two studio albums, Elle'ments (2001) and Now... Us! (2002), topped the charts and initiated two major concert tours, including the 2001 Rivers of Joy Tour and the 2002 Four Seasons Tour, both of which achieved considerable commercial success. In 2003, Wahls was removed from the group following the birth of her first child. The remaining four members subsequently recorded the band's third studio album, Pure, which was released later that year, and announced the 22-date Pure Acoustic Tour, their third concert tour, for January and February 2004. However, only a few weeks after tickets went on sale, the band announced that they would take an extended hiatus and ultimately decided to disband indefinitely, resulting in the cancellation of the tour.

In January 2007, No Angels announced at an official press conference that they had reformed and were working on a new studio album, Destiny. The reunited group consisted of Benaissa, Diakovska, Mölling, and Wahls, with Petruo choosing not to return. During the press conference, the group also announced plans for a new concert tour in the second half of 2007 in support of the album. However, the tour plans were subsequently postponed after the album and its singles fell short of the record company's commercial expectations, prompting the band and its management to reassess several planned activities over the course of their comeback year. By the end of 2007, the band's management stated that no concrete tour plans were in place, while leaving open the possibility of activities in 2008. These plans were ultimately abandoned following the group's participation in the Eurovision Song Contest in May 2008, as the band instead focused on recording their fifth studio album, Welcome to the Dance, released in August 2009. In February 2010, No Angels announced An Intimate Evening with... No Angels, a five-date club tour that revived the acoustic concept originally planned for the cancelled Pure Acoustic Tour in 2004, albeit on a significantly smaller scale, with only one-fifth as many dates.

== Production ==
The tour was promoted by former Popstars judge Mario Mendrzycki and his booking agency Triple M Entertainment, which had previously been involved in organizing tours by the group, in cooperation with Markus Wortmeier and his company Together Promotion. Ticket sales began on February 4, 2010. In addition to featuring only one-fifth as many dates as the group's previous tours, the tour was staged in significantly smaller venues, primarily in major metropolitan areas including Munich, Cologne, Frankfurt, Berlin, and Hamburg. Rather than the large concert halls used on previous tours, the group performed at smaller venues with capacities of only a few hundred spectators, including The Atomic Café, the Gruenspan, and the Gloria-Theater, complementing the tour's acoustic concept. During their performances, No Angels were accompanied by a four-piece band consisting of drums, bass, keyboard, and guitar. The stage and lighting design further intended to reflect the intimate setting, featuring bar stools, the band positioned at the rear of the stage, and several floor lamps placed around the performance area. In conjunction with the tour, the group also held autograph sessions at locations across Germany, including Munich, Frankfurt, Koblenz, and Hamburg.

Four days before the tour began, Nadja Benaissa informed her bandmates by e-mail that she would no longer participate in the group, citing the physical and psychological strain associated with her April 2009 arrest and ongoing court proceedings and following medical advice. The public was initially informed that Benaissa would be unable to participate in the tour for health reasons. Although her eventual departure from the group was not confirmed until September 2010, her absence became a major focus of the tour's media coverage and promotional campaign. The group's final appearances prior to the tour were already performed as a trio, including an appearance at the SeeFestTage festival in Styria and a performance on ZDF. Despite Benaissa's withdrawal, all scheduled concerts took place as planned. Her absence required several songs to be rearranged at short notice, with background vocalist Collin Rich, a singer associated with Kool & the Gang, performing some of Benaissa's vocal parts. Jessica Wahls later recalled that the changes initially caused confusion among the performers, as they had to adjust to the revised arrangements and vocal cues. She described the first shows as "catastrophic," while also noting the positive atmosphere surrounding the performances.

== Critical reception ==
Despite Benaissa's absence and the resulting last-minute changes to the performances, contemporary reviews of the tour were broadly positive. Critics particularly praised the group's live vocals, energetic delivery, and the stripped-back presentation of the club shows. Several reviewers also contrasted the smaller-scale format with the group's earlier arena-oriented tours, emphasizing its more intimate and mature character as well as the retrospective nature of the setlist. Audience reactions, however, were more mixed, with some concertgoers reportedly finding the musical sound different from what they had expected and others having anticipated an even more distinctly acoustic setting.

Michael Grill from the Abendzeitung gave the 17 May 2010 concert in Munich a highly positive review, calling it "great" and praising the group as "serious musicians." He highlighted their blend of funk, salsa, soul, and blues, describing the performance as lively, soulful, fresh, and occasionally nostalgic despite a somewhat disorganized start. Katharina Riehl of Süddeutsche Zeitung described the same show as a "very relaxed" production that was "not a perfectly stylized stage show with more effects than music," but instead offered an "intimate" setting with a live band. She noted that the stripped-back format made No Angels appear "quite mature" and attracted a largely adult audience of longtime fans.

Kathrin Rosendorff, writing for Offenbach Post, gave the Frankfurt concert a positive assessment, praising the No Angels for their "beautiful voices and plenty of energy" and highlighting the intimate club setting and strong support from their fans. She also noted the group's ability to perform songs spanning their ten-year history despite Benaissa's absence. Writing for CDStarts.de, Stephanie Wunderl praised No Angels for their "energy, charisma and enjoyment" and highlighting their "vocal range and precision" at the 19 May 2010 show in Cologne. She described the 100-minute performance as an engaging retrospective of the group's career, while also noting the enthusiastic audience response and the supporting band's contributions.

== Set list ==
This set list is representative of the 19 May 2010 show in Cologne.

1. "Daylight in Your Eyes"
2. "There Must Be an Angel"
3. "Rivers of Joy"
4. "Something About Us"
5. "Still in Love with You"
6. "All Cried Out"
7. "No Angel (It's All in Your Mind)"
8. "Feelgood Lies"
9. "Someday"
10. "Goodbye to Yesterday"
11. "Maybe"
12. "Make a Change"
13. "Dance-Aholic"
14. "Young Love"
15. "Derailed"
16. "Too Old"
17. "Shut Your Mouth"
18. "One Life"
19. "A Reason"

Encore

20. "Daylight in Your Eyes"

== Tour dates ==
List of concerts with date, city, and venue
Date	City	Venue
17 May 2010	München	The Atomic Café
18 May 2010	Frankfurt am Main	Velvet Club
19 May 2010	Cologne	Gloria-Theater
21 May 2010	Hamburg	Gruenspan
22 May 2010	Berlin	Passionskirche
