= Rivers of Joy Tour =

- Tour by No Angels
- Promotional poster for the tour
- Location: Austria; Germany; Switzerland
- Associated album: Elle'ments
- Start date: 19 October 2001
- End date: 10 December 2001
- No. of shows: 29

No Angels concert chronology
- Rivers of Joy Tour (2001); Four Seasons Tour (2002)

The Rivers of Joy Tour was the first concert tour by German pop group No Angels, organized in support of the band's debut studio album Elle'ments (2001). Named after the album's same-titled hit single, the tour comprised 29 concerts across Austria, Germany, and Switzerland.

== Background ==
In 2000, German television network RTL II invited aspiring singers to participate in a series of nationwide auditions for its new reality television series Popstars. The format, originally developed in New Zealand, followed the formation of a girl group from the initial auditions through the recording and release of its music and was acquired for the German market by television producer Holger Roost-Macias, who licensed it to RTL II through his production company Tresor TV. More than 4,300 applicants attended the auditions held across Germany in August and September 2000. Following a series of regional selection rounds, 32 contestants advanced to the subsequent stages of the competition in Mallorca, Spain. The final line-up was eventually formed by Nadja Benaissa, Lucy Diakovska, Sandy Mölling, Vanessa Petruo and Jessica Wahls. The five members signed a recording contract with Polydor through Roost-Macias' Cheyenne Records and were subsequently introduced as the girl group No Angels.

Following the formation of the group, Popstars continued to document the members' recording sessions, photo and music video shoots, and promotional appearances. The show's debut season concluded with No Angels' first public live performance at The Dome at the Westfalenhalle on 16 February 2001, coinciding with the release of their debut single, "Daylight in Your Eyes." The single became a major commercial success in Germany, reaching number one on the German Singles Chart and becoming the country's best-selling single of 2001. Their debut album, Elle'ments, was released on 12 March 2001 and likewise reached number one on the German Albums Chart. It went on to become the best-selling album in Germany in 2001 and was certified quintuple platinum by the Bundesverband Musikindustrie (BVMI) for shipments of more than 1 million copies in Germany. In April, No Angels embarked on a six-date club tour of Germany and Switzerland, marking their first extended live performances. The group subsequently joined Swiss singer DJ Bobo as a supporting act on selected German dates of his Planet Colors Tour, before supporting Irish boy band Westlife on selected dates of their Where Dreams Come True Tour. Preparations for No Angels' own headline tour were already underway at the time, with the tour scheduled for later in 2001.

== Production ==
The band's first headlining tour, the Rivers of Joy Tour, was announced in May 2001, with 15 dates confirmed by early June, running from 21 October to 13 November 2001. Named after the band's second single, the tour was initially planned to comprise only four concerts. Due to high demand, additional dates and venues were gradually added, including second shows at several venues in Germany and a concert at the Volkshaus in Zurich, Switzerland, running from 25 November to 10 December 2001. The opening concert in Siegen, which had initially been intended merely as a dress rehearsal, also attracted considerable demand. As a result, an additional date at the Siegerlandhalle was added at short notice, with both dates subsequently incorporated into the official tour schedule, increasing the total number of concerts from 27 to 29.

On 9 September 2001, the band promoted the tour at a press conference in Munich. Nearly six weeks before the first of the originally scheduled 27 concerts, approximately 80,000 of the 150,000 available tickets had already been sold. Rehearsals for the tour began at the end of the month and were held in a venue in Heidelberg. By the end of the tour, it had attracted more than 150,000 attendees.

== Critical reception ==
Contemporary reviews were generally positive but also noted shortcomings in the production. Berliner Zeitung praised the 26 October 2001 show at the Arena Berlin as evidence that No Angels could "not only smile in videos, but also hold their own live," describing the show as successful and highlighting its colorful staging, personable announcements, and succession of hits. The review noted that the audience's screams were even louder than those at a Backstreet Boys concert. However, it also observed that the performance was not yet fully polished or mature, quoting the group as saying, "We only had three weeks to rehearse."

== Support acts ==
- A*Teens
- Ben McCosker

== Set list ==
1. "Rivers of Joy"
2. "Be My Man (The Plan)"
3. "Send Me Flowers"
4. "Cold As Ice"
5. "Baby Can I Hold You" (Jessica's solo)
6. "You Are Everything" (Nadja's solo)
7. "You Could Be the First"
8. "Faith Can Move a Mountain
9. "When the Angels Sing"
10. "Genio Atrapado" (Vanessa's solo)
11. "River Deep – Mountain High" (Lucy's solo)
12. "Promises Can Wait"
13. "If Your Girl Only Knew"/"Try Again" (Sandy's solo)
14. "Daylight in Your Eyes"
15. "There Must Be an Angel"
16. "That's the Reason"
17. "Rivers of Joy"

== Tour dates ==
List of concerts with date, city, and venue
Date	City	Country	Venue
19 October 2001	Siegen	Germany	Siegerlandhalle
20 October 2001	Siegen	Germany	Siegerlandhalle
21 October 2001	Ludwigshafen	Germany	Eberthalle
22 October 2001	Würzburg	Germany	Carl-Diem-Halle
24 October 2001	Oberhausen	Germany	König-Pilsener-Arena
26 October 2001	Berlin	Germany	Arena Berlin
27 October 2001	Hanover	Germany	Preussag Arena
28 October 2001	Cologne	Germany	Palladium
29 October 2001	Hamburg	Germany	Congress Center Hamburg
31 October 2001	Erfurt	Germany	Thüringenhalle
3 November 2001	Böblingen	Germany	Sporthalle
4 November 2001	Frankfurt am Main	Germany	Centennial Hall
5 November 2001	Frankfurt am Main	Germany	Centennial Hall
6 November 2001	Kassel	Germany	Rundsporthalle Baunatal
7 November 2001	Münster	Germany	Halle Münsterland
9 November 2001	Zwickau	Germany	Stadthalle
11 November 2001	Nuremberg	Germany	Frankenhalle
12 November 2001	München	Germany	Zenith
13 November 2001	Vienna	Austria	Gasometer
25 November 2001	Bremen	Germany	Stadthalle Bremen
26 November 2001	Hamburg	Germany	Congress Center Hamburg
28 November 2001	Regensburg	Germany	Donau Arena
30 November 2001	Leipzig	Germany	Messehalle
2 December 2001	Brunswick	Germany	Volkswagen Halle
4 December 2001	Magdeburg	Germany	GETEC Arena
5 December 2001	Rostock	Germany	Stadthalle
6 December 2001	Berlin	Germany	Arena Berlin
7 December 2001	Koblenz	Germany	Sporthalle Oberwerth
10 December 2001	Zurich	Switzerland	Volkshaus
