= When the Angels Sing =

Single by No Angels

from the album Elle'ments
- A-side: "Atlantis"
- Released: November 19, 2001
- Studio: Park (Tutzing)
- Length: 3:44 (album version)
- Label: Cheyenne; Polydor-Zeitgeist
- Songwriters: Peter Ries; Charlemaine Thomas-Schmidtner
- Producer: Peter Ries

No Angels singles chronology
"There Must Be an Angel" (2001)	"Atlantis" / "When the Angels Sing" (2001)	"Something About Us" (2002)

"When the Angels Sing" is a song by German pop music group No Angels. It was written by Peter Ries and Charlemaine Thomas-Schmidtner and produced by the former for the band's debut studio album, Elle'ments (2001). A midtempo pop ballad, "When the Angels Sing" features a cascading piano arrangement and dominant drum pattern. Lyrically, it finds the group, as the protagonists, thinking deeply over their relationship with their love interests from whom they parted, still pining for them.

A slightly remixed version of the song was picked as the album's fourth and final single on a double A-side with a cover version of Donovan's 1968 song "Atlantis", the theme song for Walt Disney's animated feature Atlantis: The Lost Empire (2001). Released on November 19, 2001 in German-speaking Europe, the single peaked at number five on the Austrian and German Singles Chart, also reaching number 16 in Switzerland. The music video for "When the Angels Sing" features one of the group's live performances of the song during their Rivers of Joy Tour in fall 2001, intercut by backstage footage of the band.

== Background ==
"When the Angels Sing" was written by frequent No Angels collaborator, German musician Peter Ries, and American-born singer-songwriter Charlemaine Thomas-Schmidtner. Ries also oversaw production for Cheyenne Media. All music was recorded and mixed by Ries at D-2-P Studios in New York City, New York. Mike "Spike" Streefkerk, Trevor Hurst and their assistant recording engineer Stuart Jones assisted him with the recording of the vocals at the Park Studios in Tutzing at Lake Starnberg, while Popstars coach Robert Bicknell served as the vocal coach during recording. Ossi Schaller played the guitar, with Ulf Zwerger assisting in its audio engineering, while Dirk Kurock and Trevor Hurst served as Pro Tools editors.

The mid-tempo ballad was the third song that the newly formed band recorded for their debut album Elle'ments. As tracked during the final episodes of Popstars, Ries initially planned to have Nadja Benaissa sing both verses, with Vanessa Petruo leading both bridges. His plans were not well received within the remaining members of the band who felt that their absence on "When the Angels Sing" ignored their wishes to share lead vocals on all songs and displayed them as backing singers. Ries eventually revised the song, resulting in Petruo and Lucy Diakovska singing the first verse and Benaissa and Sandy Mölling sharing vocals during the second verse. Mölling also took over the first bridge from Petruo, while the second bridge was split between Petruo and Jessica Wahls.

== Release and reception ==
"When the Angels Sing" was one tracks the group performed at their first official press conference at the Parkcafé in Munich on January 9, 2001. It was eventually selected as the album's fourth and final single along with group's collaboration with Scottish singer Donovan on their rendition of his 1968 song "Atlantis", the theme song for Walt Disney's animated feature Atlantis: The Lost Empire (2001). Physical CD singles of the double-A single were released on November 19, 2001 by Cheyenne Records. The maxi single includes three new remixes of the song, including a remixed single version, and two versions of the "Atlantis" song.

Upon its release, "When the Angels Sing"/"Atlantis" debuted at number five on the German Singles Chart in the week of December 3, 2001. It spent six weeks within the top ten and fell out of the chart in the 14th weeks, becoming the 79th highest-selling single of 2001 in Germany. In Austria, the double-A single debuted at number ten on the Ö3 Austria Top 40. It peaked at number five in its third week and spent four more weeks within the top ten, leaving the top 75 after 14 weeks. In Switzerland, "When the Angels Sing"/"Atlantis" entered the Swiss Hitparade at number 56 in the week of December 2. It reached its peak, number 16, in its second week, becoming the band's first single to miss the top ten. It fell out of the top 100 after twelve weeks on the chart.

== Music video ==
A music video for "When the Angels Sing" was directed by Stefan Klotz and produced by DoRo Productions. It features one of the group's live performances of the song during their Rivers of Joy Tour in fall 2001, intercut by backstage footage of the band.

== Cover versions ==
In 2003, "When the Angels Sing" along with "Come Back" from No Angels' second album Now... Us! (2002) was re-recorded by Taiwanese girl group S.H.E for their first compilation album Together. Re-written and re-titled "Tian Shi Zai Chang Ge," it was released as a single in 2003.

== Track listings ==
Maxi single
No.	Title	Writer(s)	Producer(s)	Length
1.	"Atlantis" (radio mix)	Donovan Leitch; Leslie Mándoki; Laszlo Bencker	Mándoki	4:14
2.	"When the Angels Sing" (new radio mix)	Peter Ries; Charlemaine Thomas-Schmidtmer	Ries	3:47
3.	"When the Angels Sing" (Christmas mix)	Ries; Thomas-Schmidtmer	Ries	3:56
4.	"When the Angels Sing" (Special X-Mas mix)	Ries; Thomas-Schmidtmer	Ries	4:08
5.	"Atlantis" (Submarine mix)	Leitch; Mándoki; Bencker	Mándoki	4:00

== Credits and personnel ==
Credits adapted from the liner notes of Elle'ments.

- Nadja Benaissa – vocals
- Lucy Diakovska – vocals
- Trevor Hurst – engineer
- Stuart Jones – engineer
- Dirk Kurock – engineer
- Sandy Mölling – vocals
- Vanessa Petruo – vocals
- Peter Ries – mixing, producer, writer
- Ossi Schaller – guitar
- Mike "Spike" Streefkerk – engineer
- Charlemaine Thomas-Schmidtner – writer
- Jessica Wahls – vocals
- Ulf Zwerger – engineer

== Charts ==
=== Weekly charts ===
Weekly chart performance for "Atlantis" / "When the Angels Sing"
Chart (2001)	Peak position
Austria (Ö3 Austria Top 40)	5
Europe (Eurochart Hot 100)	25
Germany (GfK)	5
Switzerland (Schweizer Hitparade)	16

=== Year-end charts ===
Year-end chart performance for "Atlantis" / "When the Angels Sing"
Chart (2002)	Position
Austria (Ö3 Austria Top 40)	25
Germany (Media Control)	79

== Certifications ==
Certifications for "Atlantis" / "When the Angels Sing"
Region	Certification	Certified units/sales
Austria (IFPI Austria)	Gold	20,000^{*}
Germany (BVMI)	Gold	250,000^{^}
^{*} Sales figures based on certification alone.^{^} Shipments figures based on certification alone.
