= Elle'ments =

Studio album by No Angels
- Released: 12 March 2001
- Recorded: 2000–2001
- Genres: Pop; dance-pop; Europop
- Length: 46:52
- Labels: Polydor; Zeitgeist; Cheyenne
- Producers: Thorsten Brötzmann; Patrik Majer; Leslie Mándoki; Plate & Sommer; Peter Ries; Soul-O-Matic

No Angels chronology
Elle'ments (2001)	Now... Us! (2002)

Singles from Elle'ments
- 1. "Daylight in Your Eyes" Released: 5 February 2001; 2. "Rivers of Joy" Released: 30 April 2001; 3. "There Must Be an Angel" Released: 12 August 2001; 4. "When the Angels Sing"/"Atlantis" Released: 19 November 2001

Elle'ments is the debut studio album by German girl group No Angels. It was first released by Polydor–Zeitgeist and Cheyenne Records on 12 March 2001 in German-speaking Europe. After winning the inaugural season of the reality talent contest Popstars in late 2000, Polydor consulted a small team of German-based musicians to work with the quintet, including Thorsten Brötzmann, Peter Ries, Leslie Mándoki, and Peter Plate. Elle'ments is a pop record with an inclusion of styles such as dance, R&B, Latin and rock. Conceptually, the album centered on the idea of the classical elements, and during that time was compared to English girl group the Spice Girls' Forever (2000) era.

Upon its release, Elle'ments became an instant smash hit. The album peaked at number one in Austria, Germany, and Switzerland, and was eventually certified 7× Gold in Germany and reached Platinum status in both Austria and Switzerland. Additionally, it was certified Platinum by the European International Federation of the Phonographic Industry (IFPI). Elle'ments became Germany's top-selling album of 2001, with 500,000 copies sold in its first six month of release. In total, Elle'ments sold 1.1 million copies worldwide, becoming one of the biggest-selling girl group albums in music history and one of the best-selling German albums of all time.

The album yielded the record-breaking number-one hit single "Daylight in Your Eyes", and produced three further singles, including "Rivers of Joy", "When the Angels Sing" and a remake of British pop duo Eurythmics' 1985 single "There Must Be an Angel," the theme song to the animated feature The Little Polar Bear (2001), their second number-one hit in Austria and Germany. The latter song also appeared on Special Winter Edition reissue of the album, released in October 2001, along with several new songs. In fall 2001, No Angels embarked on their first concert tour, the Rivers of Joy Tour, in support of the album.

== Background ==
No Angels were formed in 2000 on the debut season of the RTL2 series Popstars, the German adaption of the international reality television franchise which set about producing a five-piece girl group. After several elimination rounds, Nadja Benaissa, Lucy Diakovska, Sandy Mölling, Vanessa Petruo and Jessica Wahls were chosen, and signed a recording contract with Cheyenne Records. With the final members of the group in place, the program followed the group during its recording sessions, photo and music video shoots and other promotional commitments such as showcases and instores. For their English language debut album, the band worked with a small group of German-based music producers, including Thorsten Brötzmann, Peter Ries, and Leslie Mándoki, as well as Rosenstolz member Peter Plate and his partner Ulf Leo Sommer, many who would become frequent collaborators on subsequent projects. Stylistically, Elle'ments takes influence from a number of different genres, such as Europop, teen pop, electro, and dance, and combines elements from pop rock, drum and bass, and contemporary R&B. The album received comparisons to artists such as Britney Spears, Destiny's Child, and the Spice Girls.

== Recording ==
Following their formation, the band members moved into a house in Munich and began work on their debut album at the Park Studios, in Tutzing, Bavaria where most their songs would be recorded. Parts of the recording sessions were tracked for the final episodes of Popstars, particularly the vocal recording of "Daylight in Your Eyes", "When the Angels Sing" and the leftover track "So Wanna Be with You". Album opener "Daylight in Your Eyes", a cover version of singer Victoria Faiella's 2000 pop rendition of the rock-tinged original song by American rock band New Life Crisis, was produced by Thorsten Brötzmann. Set against a "knee-bobbing dance beat", the "exhilarating production" features an "anthemic chorus". Brötzmann also contributed "Cold as Ice", a "cool, atmospheric" and "soft electro pop" ballad, in which a lovelorn woman realizes that her love interest is giving her the cold shoulder, and "Go Ahead and Take It", an uptempo fight song with a cheerleading motif that promotes female empowerment. "Send Me Flowers" is a pop rock song that is backed by a gospel choir. Lyrically, it has a woman demanding an apology from her lover. Closing track "That's the Reason", another Brötzmann production, co-written by Alexander Geringas, is a piano-led pop ballad with soft string arrangements and lyrics that talk about reminiscing past memories with a loved one.

Former Dschinghis Khan member Leslie Mándoki contributed the Eastern-flavored R&B track "Be My Man (The Plan)" in which a woman asks her lover to let her know about his motives, as well as the "moody" mid-tempo song "Faith Can Move a Mountain" that talks about finding comfort in others. "You Could Be the First" was produced by Patrik Majer and duo Plate & Sommer. Lyrically, the guitar-led mid-tempo song is about a woman who asks her husband to stop playing games with her; otherwise he would make her cry. Most of the other half of Elle'ments was produced by Peter Ries. Ries co-penned the mid-tempo ballad "When the Angels Sing" that features a cascading piano arrangement and dominant drum pattern. Lyrically, it finds the group thinking deeply over their relationship with their love interests from whom they parted. Uptempo song "Promises Can Wait" has a woman looking for fun instead of a love at first sight, while on mid-tempo ballad "Couldn't Care Less", built upon a pulsating backbeat and a harp pattern, she assures that she has recovered from a painful heartbreak. Dance-pop track "Rivers of Joy", another anthemic song about self-empowerment, combines elements of gospel music and Eurodance with prominent usage of a piano sample. Ballad "Cry for You", co-written by Thomas Anders, is a gentle, breezy pop song that is set against an acoustic guitar-driven instrumentation and a prominent saxophone riff. Lyrically, it talks about a woman's desire to reconcile with her former lover, who has broken up with her because of her own mistakes, leaving her in a devastated state of mind.

== Singles ==
After their formation, there was a period of indecision about what song would be released as No Angels' debut single. Cheyenne Records executives believed that the first single should be "Go Ahead and Take It", which had previously been promoted during the Popstars re-call sessions on Mallorca, while the group was adamant that their debut song should be "Daylight in Your Eyes". The executives at Cheyenne relented, and the song was chosen as their first single out of a total of ten songs that had been pre-selected to lead the parent album. Released on 5 February 2001, the song went gold within twenty-four hours in Germany and sold more than 500,000 copies within its first week of release. "Daylight in Your Eyes" peaked at number one on the German, Austrian and Swiss Singles and Airplay Charts, while also reaching the top of the Estonian Singles Chart. It became the second fastest-selling single ever in Germany up to then as well as one of the biggest-selling German singles of the 2000s.

"Rivers of Joy" was released as the album's second single on 30 April 2001. The gospel-tinged dance-pop track became the group's second top ten single in Germany and Switzerland but was significantly less successful than "Daylight in Your Eyes" and ended its chart run as Elle'ments's lowest-selling single. "There Must Be an Angel", a cover version of the 1985 song by British musical duo Eurythmics, was released as the third single from Elle'ments which was reissued on 1 October 2001. An instant smash, it debuted at number one on the German Singles Chart and also went gold in Germany and Switzerland. "There Must Be an Angel" also reached the top in Austria and peaked at number two in Switzerland. The mid-tempo ballad "When the Angels Sing" was released as album's fourth and final single on a double A-side along with a duet with Scottish singer Donovan on a re-recording of his 1968 song "Atlantis", the theme song for Walt Disney's animated feature Atlantis: The Lost Empire (2001). Released on 19 November 2001, the single peaked at number five on the Austrian and German Singles Chart.

== Critical reception ==
Professional ratings
Review scores
Source	Rating
laut.de	2/5 stars

The album received generally mixed reviews. laut.de editor Eberhard Dobler felt that the producers on the album "built No Angels a easily digestible dance-love-star-nest [...] on an international pop level – the Eurodance track 'Rivers of Joy' proves it." He remarked that "while the thirteen songs are tailored to the market [with] a little bit of Spicy (the whole band concept), a little bit of Britney ('Be My Man (The Plan)'), a little bit of R&B ('Couldn't Care Less') and even guitar pop/rock ('Send Me Flowers') [...] the laughing potential of the lyrics is hard to beat." Linus Volkmann from Intro found that Elle'ments lacked "recognition value", but admitted that it "sounds pretty good – despite the tight studio time". He complimented the album for its "varied" mix of elements, with "each song describing excursions into different pop genres: A few times R&B, a few times Katrina and the Waves uptempo, a few times disco in 1970s funk fashion."

NDR 2 described Elle'ments as a "well-produced" and "solid debut album." Der Spiegel called the songs "professionally arranged ready-made goods". In their review of the Special Winter reissue of the album, the editorial department of German television network ProSieben wrote: "Even the reissue of Elle'ments can't hide the fact that the rest of the girls' repertoire lacks the quality of their singles 'Daylight In Your Eyes', 'Rivers of Joy' and 'There Must Be an Angel'. Without a recognizable style of their own, without a recognizable line of their own, Elle'ments offers a collection of well-made pop songs, which unfortunately all too often fall back on tried, tested and well-known knitting patterns." As with Dobler, the staff compared the material to Britney Spears, the Spice Girls and Toni Braxton and concluded: "If you don't mind No Angels' lack of independence, Elle'ments undoubtedly offers a nice best-of-pop album [...] But if you look for authenticity and uniqueness, you are knocking at the wrong door."

== Chart performance ==
In March 2001, No Angels released Elle'ments in German-speaking Europe where it became an unprecedented success due to the sheer volume of interest in the group. The album debuted at number one on the Austrian, German, and Swiss Albums Charts, making the band the first act ever to simultaneously top the albums, singles, and airplay charts – along with "Daylight in Your Eyes" – in all three territories. In Germany, Elle'ments peaked at number one for three consecutive weeks in which it passed the sales mark of 500,000 units. By August 2001, it had reached double platinum status, indicating sales in excess of 600,000 copies. Following the release of its Special Winter Edition in October, Elle'ments re-entered the top ten at number seven. In total, the album spent 74 consecutive weeks within the top 100 of the German Albums Chart and was eventually certified triple platinum and 7× Gold by the Bundesverband Musikindustrie (BVMI) for domestic sales in excess of 1.05 million copies. It was the highest-selling album of 2001 in Germany.

In Austria, Elle'ments charted four non-consecutive weeks at the top of the Ö3 Austria Top 40 Longplay chart. It was certified platinum by IFPI Austria, indicating sales in excess of 40,000 units, and became the fifth highest-selling album that year. In Switzerland, the album sold further 40,000 copies and also was awarded a platinum certification by IFPI Switzerland. It spent four non-consecutive weeks at number-one on the Swiss Hitparade and was ranked ninth on the Swiss year-end albums chart. Elle'ments also debuted at number six on Billboard's European Top 100 Albums chart, and peaked at number five in its third week of release. Altogether, the album became the 41st biggest-selling album of 2001 in Europe – the only entry for any international Popstars winner that year – and was certified platinum by the International Federation of the Phonographic Industry (IFPI) for shipments of one million copies. In total, the album sold 1.1 million copies worldwide, becoming the most successful girl group album in German music history as well as one of the biggest-selling products to emerge from the Popstars reality television franchise. In 2013, Elle'ments was ranked among the twenty best-selling German albums of all time.

== Track listing ==
Credits adapted from the liner notes of Elle'ments.

Elle'ments – Standard edition
No.	Title	Writer(s)	Producer(s)	Length
1.	"Daylight in Your Eyes"	Tony Bruno; Tommy Byrnes	Thorsten Brötzmann	3:30
2.	"When the Angels Sing"	Peter Ries; Charlemaine Thomas-Schmidtmer	Peter Ries	3:42
3.	"Promises Can Wait"	Ries; Dawn Faith Schönherz	Ries	3:21
4.	"You Could Be the First"	Ralf Lübke	Patrik Majer; Plate & Sommer	3:27
5.	"Cold as Ice"	David Brunner; Christopher Cousins; Marc Klammer	Brötzmann	4:04
6.	"Rivers of Joy"	Niklas Pettersson; Hans Andersson	Ries	3:28
7.	"Be My Man (The Plan)"	Leslie Mandoki; Laszlo Bencker	Mandoki	3:28
8.	"Go Ahead And Take It"	Brötzmann; Ulrich Wehner	Brötzmann	2:50
9.	"Couldn't Care Less"	Franciz & LePont	Peter Ries	3:33
10.	"Faith Can Move a Mountain"	Julian Feifel	Mandoki	3:28
11.	"Cry for You"	Thomas Anders; Christian Geller	Ries	4:49
12.	"Send Me Flowers"	Axel Breitung	Brötzmann	3:49
13.	"That's the Reason"	Brötzmann; Alexander Geringas	Brötzmann	3:15
Total length:				46:52

Elle'ments – Special winter edition
No.	Title	Writer(s)	Producer(s)	Length
1.	"There Must Be an Angel"	Annie Lennox; David A. Stewart	Majer; Plate & Sommer	3:55
2.	"When the Angels Sing"	Ries; Thomas-Schmidtmer	Ries	3:42
3.	"What Am I Supposed to Do"	Harry Zier; Rob Hardt; Senait Mehari	Soul-O-Matic	4:08
4.	"100% Emotional"	Johan Aberg; Paul Rein; Winston Sela	Peter Ries	3:03
5.	"Daylight in Your Eyes"	Bruno; Byrnes	Brötzmann	3:30
6.	"Promises Can Wait"	Ries; Schönherz	Ries	3:21
7.	"You Could Be the First"	Lübke	Majer; Plate & Sommer	3:27
8.	"Cold as Ice"	Brunner; Cousins; Klammer	Brötzmann	4:04
9.	"Rivers of Joy"	Pettersson; Andersson	Peter Ries	3:28
10.	"Be My Man (The Plan)"	Mandoki; Bencker	Mandoki	3:28
11.	"Go Ahead and Take It"	Brötzmann; Wehner	Brötzmann	2:50
12.	"Couldn't Care Less"	Franciz & LePont	Ries	3:33
13.	"Faith Can Move a Mountain"	Feifel	Mandoki	3:28
14.	"Cry for You"	Anders; Geller	Peter Ries	4:49
15.	"Send Me Flowers"	Breitung	Brötzmann	3:49
16.	"That's the Reason"	Brötzmann; Geringas	Brötzmann	3:15
Total length:				57:57

== Credits and personnel ==
Credits adapted from the liner notes of Elle'ments.

Performers and musicians

- Laszlo Bencker – various instruments
- Christoph Leis-Bendorff – vocal assistance
- Thorsten Brötzmann – keyboards
- Joan Faulkner – vocal assistance
- Nico Fintzen – keyboards
- Stefan Hansen – keyboards
- Tony Laketos – saxophone
- Ralf Lübke – guitar
- Anja Mähnken – vocal assistance
- Leslie Mándoki – various instruments
- Ossi Schaller – guitar
- Marion Schwaiger – vocal assistance
- Peter Weihe – guitar

Technical

- Thorsten Brötzmann – production
- Lines Hutter – engineer
- Jeo – mixing
- Stuart Jones – assistant engineer
- Söhnke Kirchner – mixing
- J. Quincy Kramer – mastering
- Bernhardt Kühmstedt – photography
- Patrik Majer – production
- Leslie Mándoki – production
- Plate & Sommer – production
- Ronald Reinsberg – art direction
- Peter Ries – production, mixing
- Mike Streefkerk – engineer
- Stefan Zeh – assistant engineer
- Martin Zehetbauer – engineer
- Ulf Zwerger – engineer

== Leftover tracks ==
- "Don't Hesitate" (appeared on the 2001 Magix Video Maker DVD/CD)
- "Let Me Be the One" (Magix Video Maker)
- "Nitelife" (Magix Video Maker)
- "So Wanna Be with You" (produced by Thorsten Brötzmann) (appeared on the 2004 compilation album History of Popstars)
- "Wherever You Go" (Magix Video Maker)

== Charts ==
=== Weekly charts ===
Weekly chart performance for Elle'ments
Chart (2001)	Peak position
Austrian Albums (Ö3 Austria)	1
European Top 100 Albums (Billboard)	5
German Albums (Offizielle Top 100)	1
Swiss Albums (Schweizer Hitparade)	1

=== Year-end charts ===
2001 year-end chart performance for Elle'ments
Chart (2001)	Position
Austrian Albums (Ö3 Austria)	5
German Albums (Official Top 100)	1
Swiss Albums (Schweizer Hitparade)	9

2002 year-end chart performance for Elle'ments
Chart (2002)	Position
Austrian Albums (Ö3 Austria)	62
German Albums (Official Top 100)	47

== Certifications ==
Certifications for Elle'ments
Region	Certification	Certified units/sales
Austria (IFPI Austria)	Platinum	40,000^{*}
Germany (BVMI)	7× Gold	1,050,000^{^}
Switzerland (IFPI Switzerland)	Platinum	40,000^{^}
Summaries
Europe (IFPI)	Platinum	1,000,000^{*}
^{*} Sales figures based on certification alone.^{^} Shipments figures based on certification alone.

== Release history ==
Elle'ments release history
Region	Date	Edition(s)	Format(s)	Label(s)	Ref.
Austria	12 March 2001	Standard; limited	Digital download; CD	Polydor; Zeitgeist; Cheyenne	
Germany	12 March 2001	Standard; limited	Digital download; CD	Polydor; Zeitgeist; Cheyenne	
Switzerland	12 March 2001	Standard; limited	Digital download; CD	Polydor; Zeitgeist; Cheyenne	
Austria	1 October 2001	Special winter	Digital download; CD	Polydor; Zeitgeist; Cheyenne	
Germany	1 October 2001	Special winter	Digital download; CD	Polydor; Zeitgeist; Cheyenne	
Switzerland	1 October 2001	Special winter	Digital download; CD	Polydor; Zeitgeist; Cheyenne	
Various	26 November 2021	20th anniversary	Vinyl	BMG	

== See also ==
- List of best-selling albums in Germany
