= List of number-one hits of 2001 (Germany) =

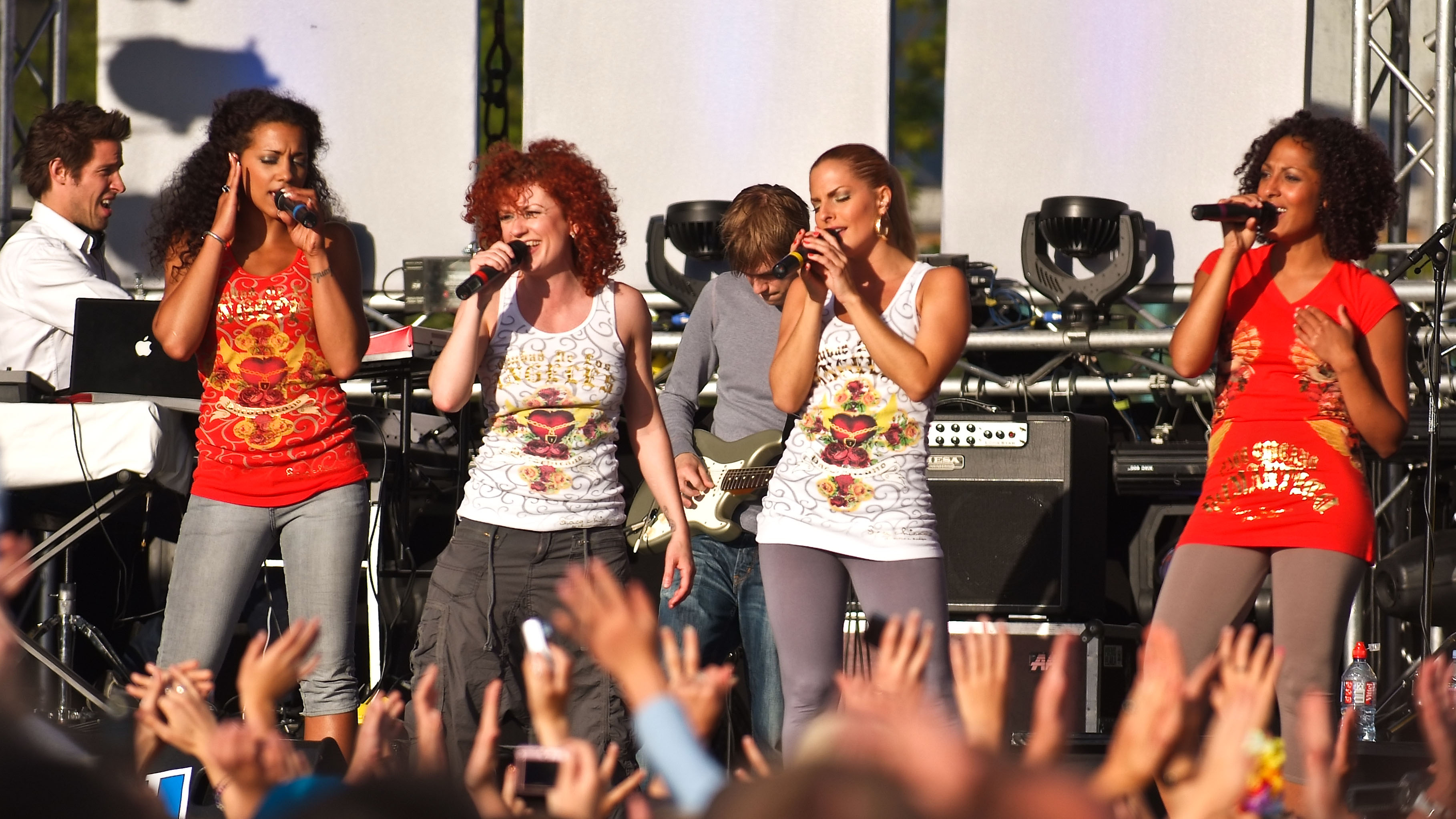
No Angels's (pictured) "Elle'ments" and "Daylight in Your Eyes" became the best-performing album and single of the year respectively.

This is a list of the German Media Control Top100 Singles Chart number-ones of 2001.

== Number-one hits by week ==
Key
| † | Indicates best-performing single and album of 2001 |

| Issue date | Song | Artist | Ref. | Album | Artist | Ref. |
|---|---|---|---|---|---|---|
| 1 January | No release (Note: Same issue as for 25 December 2000.) | | | | | |
| 8 January | "Es ist geil ein Arschloch zu sein" | Christian | | 1 | The Beatles | |
| 15 January | "Es ist geil ein Arschloch zu sein" | Christian | | 1 | The Beatles | |
| 22 January | "Es ist geil ein Arschloch zu sein" | Christian | | 1 | The Beatles | |
| 29 January | "Stan" | Eminem featuring Dido | | 1 | The Beatles | |
| 5 February | "Ms. Jackson" | Outkast | | J.Lo | Jennifer Lopez | |
| 12 February | "Ms. Jackson" | Outkast | | J.Lo | Jennifer Lopez | |
| 19 February | "Daylight in Your Eyes" † | No Angels | | J.Lo | Jennifer Lopez | |
| 26 February | "Daylight in Your Eyes" † | No Angels | | 1 | The Beatles | |
| 5 March | "Daylight in Your Eyes" † | No Angels | | Heute vor dreissig Jahren | Peter Maffay | |
| 12 March | "Daylight in Your Eyes" † | No Angels | | Heute vor dreissig Jahren | Peter Maffay | |
| 19 March | "Daylight in Your Eyes" † | No Angels | | Heute vor dreissig Jahren | Peter Maffay | |
| 26 March | "Daylight in Your Eyes" † | No Angels | | Elle'ments † | No Angels | |
| 2 April | "Butterfly" | Crazy Town | | Elle'ments † | No Angels | |
| 9 April | "Butterfly" | Crazy Town | | Elle'ments † | No Angels | |
| 16 April | "Butterfly" | Crazy Town | | Mutter | Rammstein | |
| 23 April | "Butterfly" | Crazy Town | | Mutter | Rammstein | |
| 30 April | "Butterfly" | Crazy Town | | Mutter | Rammstein | |
| 7 May | "Dream On" | Depeche Mode | | Mutter | Rammstein | |
| 14 May | "Butterfly" | Crazy Town | | Survivor | Destiny's Child | |
| 21 May | "Whole Again" | Atomic Kitten | | Survivor | Destiny's Child | |
| 28 May | "Whole Again" | Atomic Kitten | | Exciter | Depeche Mode | |
| 4 June | "Whole Again" | Atomic Kitten | | Exciter | Depeche Mode | |
| 11 June | "Whole Again" | Atomic Kitten | | Reveal | R.E.M. | |
| 18 June | "Whole Again" | Atomic Kitten | | Reveal | R.E.M. | |
| 25 June | "Whole Again" | Atomic Kitten | | Aff un zo | BAP | |
| 2 July | "Miss California" | Dante Thomas | | Take Off Your Pants and Jacket | Blink-182 | |
| 9 July | "Lady Marmalade" | Christina Aguilera, Pink, Lil' Kim and Mýa featuring Missy Elliott | | Aff un zo | BAP | |
| 16 July | "Angel" | Shaggy featuring Rayvon | | Hot Shot | Shaggy | |
| 23 July | "Angel" | Shaggy featuring Rayvon | | Hot Shot | Shaggy | |
| 30 July | "Angel" | Shaggy featuring Rayvon | | Hot Shot | Shaggy | |
| 6 August | "Angel" | Shaggy featuring Rayvon | | Hot Shot | Shaggy | |
| 13 August | "Follow Me" | Uncle Kracker | | Weltreise | Schiller | |
| 20 August | "Follow Me" | Uncle Kracker | | Weltreise | Schiller | |
| 27 August | "There Must Be an Angel" | No Angels | | Weltreise | Schiller | |
| 3 September | "There Must Be an Angel" | No Angels | | Weltreise | Schiller | |
| 10 September | "There Must Be an Angel" | No Angels | | Hits Pur - 20 Jahre eine Band | Pur | |
| 17 September | "There Must Be an Angel" | No Angels | | Hits Pur - 20 Jahre eine Band | Pur | |
| 24 September | "There Must Be an Angel" | No Angels | | Hits Pur - 20 Jahre eine Band | Pur | |
| 1 October | "Only Time" | Enya | | Hits Pur - 20 Jahre eine Band | Pur | |
| 8 October | "Only Time" | Enya | | A Day Without Rain | Enya | |
| 15 October | "Only Time" | Enya | | A Day Without Rain | Enya | |
| 22 October | "Only Time" | Enya | | Fever | Kylie Minogue | |
| 29 October | "Only Time" | Enya | | A Day Without Rain | Enya | |
| 5 November | "Only Time" | Enya | | Fever | Kylie Minogue | |
| 12 November | "Can't Get You Out of My Head" | Kylie Minogue | | Invincible | Michael Jackson | |
| 19 November | "Because I Got High" | Afroman | | Britney | Britney Spears | |
| 26 November | "From Sarah with Love" | Sarah Connor | | Echoes: The Best of Pink Floyd | Pink Floyd | |
| 3 December | "From Sarah with Love" | Sarah Connor | | Swing When You're Winning | Robbie Williams | |
| 10 December | "From Sarah with Love" | Sarah Connor | | Swing When You're Winning | Robbie Williams | |
| 17 December | "I Believe" | Bro'Sis | | Swing When You're Winning | Robbie Williams | |
| 24 December | "I Believe" | Bro'Sis | | Swing When You're Winning | Robbie Williams | |
| 31 December | No release (Note: Same issue as for 24 December.) | | | | | |

== See also ==
- List of number-one hits (Germany)
