= Letekidan Micael =

Eritrean actress (born 1997)

- Born: Letekidan Micael; 1997; Eritrea
- Occupation(s): Actress, choreographer, composer
- Years active: 1995–present
- Notable work: Feuerherz

Letekidan Micael (born 1997) is an Eritrean actress. She is notable for the role 'Awet' in the critically acclaim film Feuerherz.

== Personal life ==
She was born in 1997 in Asmara, Eritrea. When she acted in the war drama film Feuerherz, her family received anonymous threat messages. Therefore they granted political asylum in Europe.

== Career ==
In 2008 at the age of 10, Micael starred in the German film Feuerherz, later titled in English as Heart of Fire. It was premiered on 25 September 2008. The film sets during Eritrea's war of independence against Ethiopia, which was loosely based on the autobiography of Eritrean-born German singer Senait Mehari. The film received positive reviews from critics and praised Micael's role as a child soldier, 'Awet'.

== Filmography ==
Year	Film	Role	Genre	Ref.
2008	Feuerherz	Awet	Film	
