= Heart of Fire =

Heart of Fire may refer to:

- "Heart of Fire", a song by Black Veil Brides from Black Veil Brides
- Heart of Fire (2009 film), a German docudrama
- Heart of Fire (1997 film), an American TV film
- Heart of Fire Church, a church founded by Kentucky politician Dan Johnson

== See also ==
- Hearts of Fire, a 1987 American musical drama film
