= Ten Steps Back =

Single by Jess
- Released: 8 September 2003
- Length: 2:51
- Label: Cheyenne; Polydor Island
- Songwriter(s): Anders Bagge; Arnthor Birgisson; Kandi Burruss
- Producer(s): Björn Krumbügel; Yanou

Jess singles chronology
"Ten Steps Back" (2003)	"Don't Get Me Started" (2004)

"Ten Steps Back" is a song by German recording artist Jessica Wahls. It was written by Anders Bagge, Arnthor Birgisson, and Kandi Burruss, and produced by Björn Krumbügel, featuring co-production from Yann "Yanou" Peifer. Cheyenne Records and Polydor Island released the uptempo song as Wahls's solo debut single on 8 September 2003 following her departure from No Angels. It debuted and peaked at number 41 on the German Singles Chart.

== Track listings ==
CD single
No.	Title	Length
1.	"Ten Steps Back" (Radio Version)	2:51
2.	"Ten Steps Back" (Video Version)	3:01

Maxi single
No.	Title	Length
1.	"Ten Steps Back" (Radio Version)	2:51
2.	"Ten Steps Back" (Video Version)	3:01
3.	"Ten Steps Back" (Extended Version)	4:34
4.	"Ten Steps Back" (Karaoke Version)	2:51

== Personnel and credits ==
Credits adapted from the liner notes of "Ten Steps Back."

- Anders Bagge – writing
- Arnthor Birgisson – writing
- Kandi Burruss – writing
- Nike Hafeman – vocal recording
- Björn Krumbügel – production
- Alexa Phazer – backing vocals
- Peter Ries – mixing
- Solomon Thomas – arrangement
- Yanou – co-production, arrangement
- Ulf Zwerger – vocal recording

== Charts ==
Chart (2003)	Peak position
Austria (Ö3 Austria Top 40)	54
Germany (GfK)	41

== Release history ==
"Ten Steps Back" release history
Region	Date	Format	Label	Ref
Various	8 September 2003	CD single; digital download	Cheyenne	
