= There Must Be an Angel (Playing with My Heart) =

1985 single by Eurythmics

Single by Eurythmics

from the album Be Yourself Tonight
- B-side: "Grown Up Girls"
- Released: 24 June 1985
- Genre: Pop
- Length: 4:32 (7-inch version); 5:22 (album version)
- Label: RCA
- Songwriters: Annie Lennox; Dave Stewart
- Producer: Dave Stewart

Eurythmics singles chronology
"Would I Lie to You?" (1985)	"There Must Be an Angel (Playing with My Heart)" (1985)	"Sisters Are Doin' It for Themselves" (1985)

Music video
- "There Must Be an Angel (Playing with My Heart)" on YouTube

"There Must Be an Angel (Playing with My Heart)" is a song by the British musical duo Eurythmics, released as the second single from their fifth studio album, Be Yourself Tonight (1985). It features a harmonica solo by American musician Stevie Wonder. The song became a worldwide success; reaching number one in Finland, Ireland, Norway, and the United Kingdom, where it remains the duo's only chart-topper.

In 2001, a cover version of "There Must Be an Angel" by the German girl group No Angels also achieved commercial success, reaching number one in Germany and Austria and number two in Switzerland.

== Original version ==
David Stewart recalled that he served as the producer for the overdub session with Stevie Wonder, who played harmonica on the song. At one point during the recording session, Wonder inquired if his playing was sufficient. Stewart assured Wonder that this was the case and advised him to improvise for 16 bars on the harmonica. Wonder responded playing various sea shanties as a joke, which helped to bring a sense of levity to the recording studio according to Stewart, who also documented the interaction on a cassette.

Upon its release, "There Must Be an Angel (Playing with My Heart)" became Eurythmics' first (and to date only) number-one single in the United Kingdom, reaching number one on 27 July 1985 and staying there for one week, whilst also topping the charts in Finland, Ireland and Norway. The song also reached the top 10 in Australia, Austria, Belgium, France, Germany, the Netherlands, New Zealand and Sweden, and peaked at number 22 on the US Billboard Hot 100.

== Reception ==
Cashbox said that the "Annie Lennox harmonies, slick Dave Stewart production work and Stevie Wonder's incredible harmonica" were highlights of the song. Billboard similarly praised Wonder's harmonica bridge and Lennox’s "absolutely happy" lead vocals.

Spin wrote it was, "in the tradition of the best MOR pop, reminiscent of Dusty Springfield and Dionne Warwick. It's sweet but not syrupy, the background voices so otherworldly I can only guess if they are human or synthesized."

== Music video ==
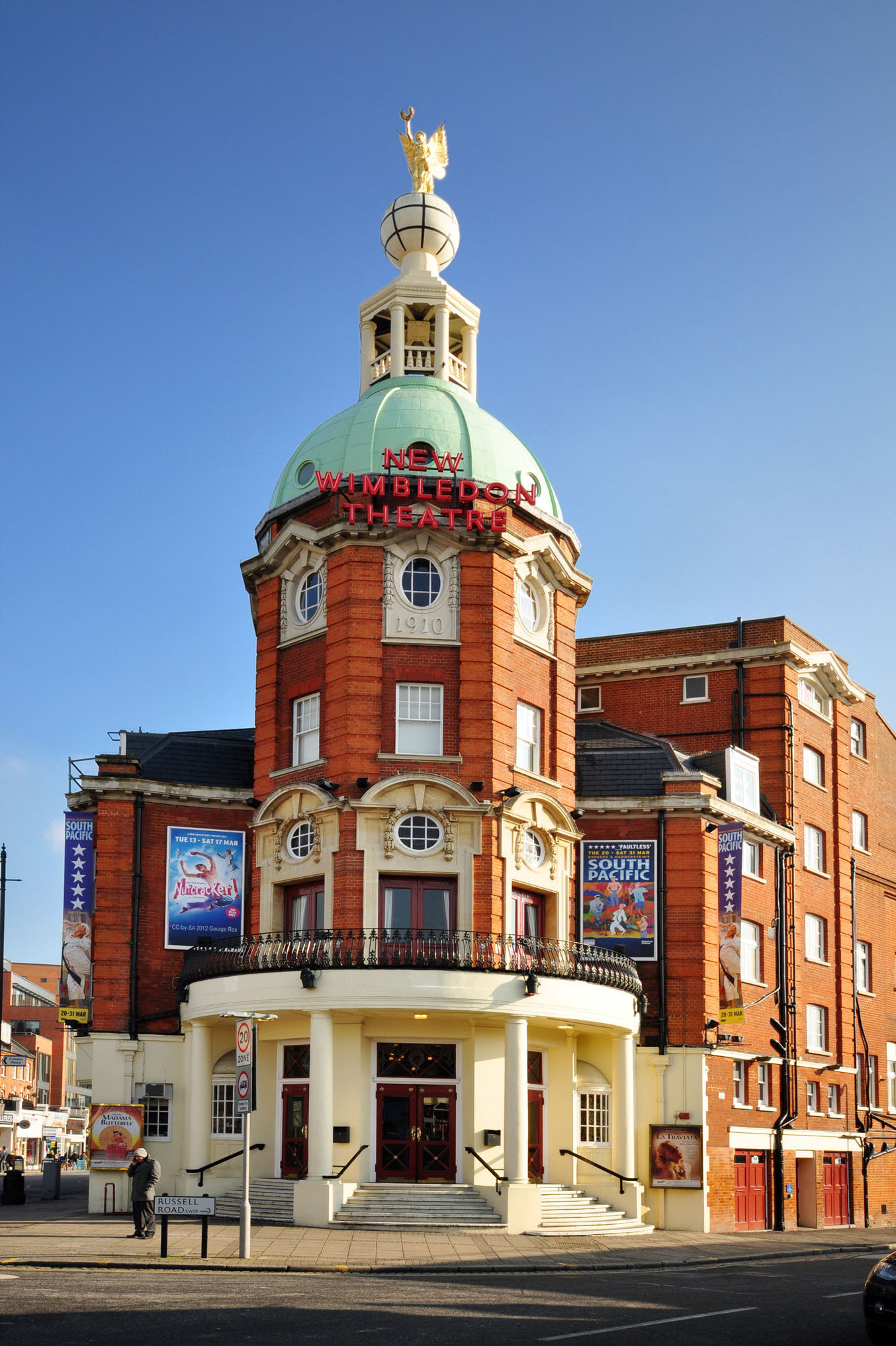
The accompanying music video was shot at New Wimbledon Theatre in London.

The music video for "There Must Be an Angel (Playing with My Heart)", directed by Eddie Arno and Mark Innocenti, was shot at New Wimbledon Theatre in London in June 1985. It portrays the court of Louis XIV (David A. Stewart) being entertained while watching a theatrical performance of Annie Lennox with a troupe of singing cherubs and angels (one of which is played by Steven O'Donnell).

== Track listings ==
- 7-inch single

A. "There Must Be an Angel (Playing with My Heart)" (7″ edit) – 4:36
B. "Grown Up Girls" – 4:17

- 12-inch single

A. "There Must Be an Angel (Playing with My Heart)" (LP version) – 5:22
B. "Grown Up Girls" – 4:17

- 12-inch single (Special Dance Mix)

A. "There Must Be an Angel (Playing with My Heart)" (Special Dance Mix) – 6:20
B. "Grown Up Girls" – 4:17

== Credits and personnel ==
=== Eurythmics ===
- Annie Lennox – vocals, keyboards
- David A. Stewart – keyboards

=== Additional personnel ===
- Stevie Wonder – harmonica
- Michael Kamen – strings
- Dean Garcia – bass guitar
- Olle Romo – drums
- Angel Cross – backing vocals

== Charts ==
=== Weekly charts ===
Weekly chart performance for "There Must Be an Angel (Playing with My Heart)"
Chart (1985)	Peak position
Australia (Kent Music Report)	3
Austria (Ö3 Austria Top 40)	9
Belgium (Ultratop 50 Flanders)	7
Canada Top Singles (RPM)	12
Canada Adult Contemporary (RPM)	21
Europe (European Top 100 Singles)	5
Finland (Suomen virallinen lista)	1
France (SNEP)	8
Ireland (IRMA)	1
Netherlands (Dutch Top 40)	4
Netherlands (Single Top 100)	3
New Zealand (Recorded Music NZ)	5
Norway (VG-lista)	1
South Africa (Springbok Radio)	6
Spain (AFYVE)	2
Sweden (Sverigetopplistan)	2
UK Singles (Official Charts)	1
US Billboard Hot 100	22
US Dance Club Songs (Billboard) with "Grown Up Girls"	31
US Dance Singles Sales (Billboard) with "Grown Up Girls"	36
US Cash Box Top 100 Singles	23
West Germany (GfK)	4

=== Year-end charts ===
Year-end chart performance for "There Must Be an Angel (Playing with My Heart)"
Chart (1985)	Position
Australia (Kent Music Report)	39
Belgium (Ultratop 50 Flanders)	63
Canada Top Singles (RPM)	87
Netherlands (Dutch Top 40)	33
Netherlands (Single Top 100)	27
New Zealand (RIANZ)	39
UK Singles (Gallup)	20
West Germany (Media Control)	45

== Certifications ==
Certifications for "There Must Be an Angel (Playing with My Heart)"
Region	Certification	Certified units/sales
Canada (Music Canada)	Gold	50,000^{^}
New Zealand (RMNZ)	Gold	15,000^{‡}
United Kingdom (BPI)	Silver	200,000^{‡}
^{^} Shipments figures based on certification alone.^{‡} Sales+streaming figures based on certification alone.

== No Angels version ==
"There Must Be an Angel"

Single by No Angels

from the album Elle'ments
- Released: 12 August 2001
- Studio: Audiostudios (Berlin, Germany)
- Length: 3:55
- Label: Cheyenne; Polydor; Zeitgeist
- Songwriters: Annie Lennox; David A. Stewart
- Producers: Patrik Majer; Peter Plate; Ulf Leo Sommer

No Angels singles chronology
"Rivers of Joy" (2001)	"There Must Be an Angel" (2001)	"Atlantis" / "When the Angels Sing" (2001)

=== Recording and release ===
In mid-2001, producers Patrik Majer, Ulf Leo Sommer, and Rosenstolz member Peter Plate consulted on a contemporary version of the track, recorded by German girl band No Angels. Suggested for re-recording by band manager Joy Berhanu, the Eurythmics song was one of a couple of tracks considered to be remade by the quintet but was eventually picked when the producers of the animated feature The Little Polar Bear agreed to accept the track as film's theme song. "We were speechless and very happy about [the decision]. The animated movie was a world premiere and something really big for us. We immediately said 'yes'," Lucy Diakovska said in an interview. Sandy Mölling noted, that the song was an all-time favourite of the band: "I liked Annie Lennox' voice ever since I can remember." However, in a 2005 interview, Vanessa Petruo revealed her discontent with the song, calling it the "most unnecessary" of all cover versions the band had released between the years of 2001 and 2003.

"There Must Be an Angel" premiered on 9 July 2001, on the RTL Berlin radio network, receiving a positive reception from music critics, and on 17 July 2001 a preview was available on-demand in its entirety on the band's official website. Finally released as the band's third single on 12 August 2001 in German-speaking Europe, the original CD single spawned both an unplugged and an orchestral version, latter featuring music by the Deutsches Filmorchester Babelsberg. The record was subsequently included on the Special Winter Edition reissue of the Elle'ments album (2001). "There Must Be an Angel" was awarded for "Top Single Germany" at the 2001 Top of the Pops Awards.

=== Commercial performance ===
The group's first non-album release following "Daylight in Your Eyes" and "Rivers of Joy", the single debuted at number one on the German Singles Chart, staying at the top for five consecutive weeks, 12 weeks in the top 40, and 17 weeks inside the top 60. "There Must Be an Angel" was eventually certified gold by the Bundesverband Musikindustrie (BVMI) for more than 250,000 shipped copies and ranked 13th on the 2001 year-end chart in Germany.

In Austria, the single opened at number eight on the Ö3 Austria Top 40 singles chart. However, it was not until 23 September 2001, the song's fifth week of release, "There Must Be an Angel" eventually climbed to the top spot. It remained another week at number one and spent 21 weeks within the top 60 of the chart, ranking 19th on the Austrian year-end chart in 2001. In Switzerland, the single debuted at number 36 on the Swiss Singles Chart. Benefiting from strong airplay, the song reached number two in its third week of release, becoming No Angels' second highest-charting single there to date. As in Germany, "There Must Be an Angel" was certified gold by the Swiss arm of the International Federation of the Phonographic Industry (IFPI) and ranked 21 on the Swiss year-end chart. In Poland, "There Must Be an Angel" reached number 29 on the Polish Airplay Chart.

=== Music video ===
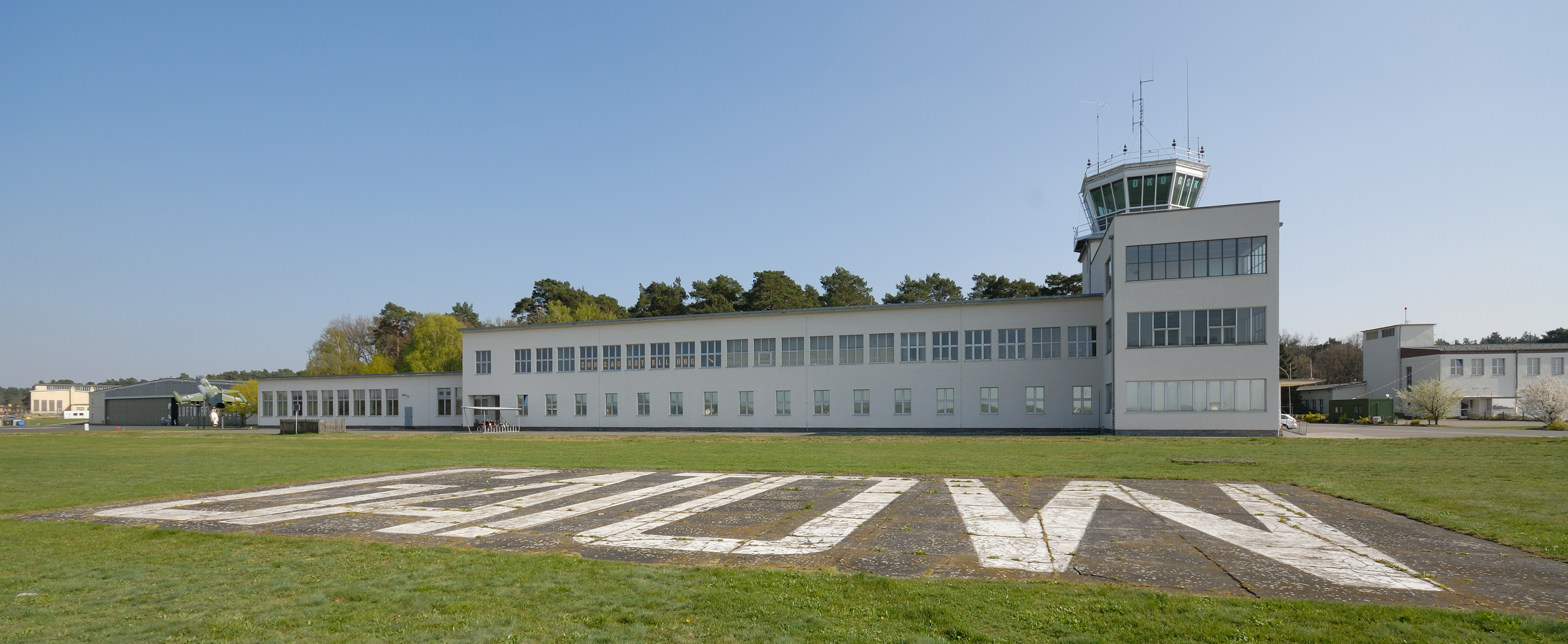
The music video for "There Must Be an Angel" was filmed at the Gatow Airport in Berlin-Spandau.

The music video for "There Must Be an Angel" was directed by Jörn Heitmann and filmed near the General-Steinhof-Kaserne at the Gatow Airport in Berlin-Spandau, Germany, on 19 July 2001. Inspired by Tony Scott's 1986 film Top Gun, the clip features the quintet as fighter pilots of the fictional US military squadron 68 at an also-fictional airbase in Angelville, United States. Additionally, it incorporates a 1940s World War II theme, heavily inspired by performances of Marilyn Monroe, The Andrews Sisters and others during their USO shows. Among the aircraft shown in the video are MiG-21s, a B-57 Canberra, an F-104 Starfighter and a Dassault Mystère. "There Must Be an Angel" world premiered in early August 2001 on television but was temporarily banned from music networks due to its military theme, following the 11 September 2001 attacks.

=== Track listings ===
Maxi single
No.	Title	Writer(s)	Producer(s)	Length
1.	"There Must Be an Angel" (Radio Edit)	Annie Lennox; David A. Stewart	Patrik Majer; Peter Plate; Ulf Leo Sommer	3:55
2.	"There Must Be an Angel" (Unplugged Version)	Lennox; Stewart	Majer; Plate; Sommer	4:22
3.	"There Must Be an Angel" (Score Version)	Lennox; Stewart	Majer; Plate; Sommer	5:34
4.	"100% Emotional" (Radio Edit)	Johan Åberg; Paul Rein; Winston Sela	Peter Ries	3:03

2-Track CD single
No.	Title	Writer(s)	Producer(s)	Length
1.	"There Must Be an Angel" (Radio Edit)	Lennox; Stewart	Majer; Plate; Sommer	3:55
2.	"There Must Be an Angel" (Unplugged Version)	Lennox; Stewart	Majer; Plate; Sommer	4:22

=== Credits and personnel ===
Credits are adapted from the liner notes of the Special Winter Edition of Elle'ments.

- Vocals: N. Benaissa, L. Diakovska, S. Mölling, V. Petruo, J. Wahls
- Writers: Patrik Majer, Peter Plate, Ulf Leo Sommer
- Mixing and recording: Patrik "El Pattino" Majer
- Mastering: Michael Schwabe
- Keyboards and programming: P. Majer
  - Additional keyboards: Peter Plate
- Guitars: Peter Weihe
- Strings: The Hamburg Strings

=== Charts ===
==== Weekly charts ====
Weekly chart performance for "There Must Be an Angel"
Chart (2001)	Peak position
Austria (Ö3 Austria Top 40)	1
Europe (Eurochart Hot 100)	3
Germany (GfK)	1
Poland Airplay (Music & Media)	16
Poland (Polish Airplay Charts)	29
Romania (Romanian Top 100)	17
Switzerland (Schweizer Hitparade)	2

==== Year-end charts ====
2001 year-end chart performance for "There Must Be an Angel"
Chart (2001)	Position
Austria (Ö3 Austria Top 40)	19
Germany (Media Control)	13
Switzerland (Schweizer Hitparade)	21

2002 year-end chart performance for "There Must Be an Angel"
Chart (2002)	Position
Brazil (Crowley)	52

=== Certifications ===
Certifications for "There Must Be an Angel"
Region	Certification	Certified units/sales
Germany (BVMI)	Gold	400,000
Switzerland (IFPI Switzerland)	Gold	20,000^{^}
^{^} Shipments figures based on certification alone.
