= Rivers of Joy (song) =

Single by No Angels

from the album Elle'ments
- Released: 30 April 2001
- Studio: Westpark (Munich, Germany)
- Length: 3:30
- Label: Cheyenne; Polydor; Zeitgeist
- Songwriters: Hans Andersson; Niklas Petterson
- Producer: Peter Ries

No Angels singles chronology
"Daylight in Your Eyes" (2001)	"Rivers of Joy" (2001)	"There Must Be an Angel" (2001)

"Rivers of Joy" is a song recorded by all-female German pop group No Angels. It was written by Hans Andersson and Niklas Petterson from Swedish composing duo Petterson & Haze and recorded by the band for their debut studio album, Elle'ments (2001). Production on the track was helmed by German musician Peter Ries.

The song was released by Cheyenne Records as the album's second single on 30 April 2001. The song reached the top ten in Germany and Switzerland. This however, made "Rivers of Joy" the lowest-charting single of the Elle'ments era, as both singles of the reissue charted significantly higher. An accompanying music video for "Rivers of Joy" was directed by Robert Bröllochs and filmed in Groß-Gerau, Germany in early April 2001. It featured the group as marble statues, awakening to life in a museum of art.

== Background ==
"Rivers of Joy" was written by Swedish composing duo Petterson & Haze, consisting of Hans Andersson and Niklas Petterson, and produced and mixed by frequent No Angels collaborator, German musician Peter Ries, for Cheyenne Media. All music was recorded by Ries at DPB Studios in New York City. Ossi Schaller played the guitar, with Ulf Zwerger assisting in its audio engineering, while Dirk Kurock and Trevor Hurst served as Pro Tools editors. Martin Faulwasser and Mecx and their assistant Martin Zehetbauer oversaw the recording of the vocals at the Westpark Studios in Munich, with Popstars coach Robert Bicknell assisting in vocal coaching. Additional background vocals were provided by singers Gina Dunn, Joan Faulkner, and Charlemaine Thomas-Schmidtner, and were arranged by Ries.

== Release and reception ==
Selected as the album's second single by the group's records company, physical singles of "Rivers of Joy" were released on 30 April 2001 by Cheyenne Records. The maxi single includes several remixes of the song, as well as a Ries-produced Re-Supreme Remix of previous single "Daylight in Your Eyes", a voice message, and the previously unreleased record "What Am I Supposed to Do", produced by Soul-O-Matic and written by Harry Zier, Rob Hardt, and singer Senait Mehari.

Upon its release, "Rivers of Joy" debuted at number seven on the German Singles Chart for the week of 14 May 2001. It fell out of the top 20 in its seventh week and left the chart after 11 weeks, ranking as the 86th best-selling single of 2001 in Germany. In Austria, the single debuted and peaked at number eleven on the Ö3 Austria Top 40. It remained two more weeks within the top twenty and spent twelve weeks within the top 75. In Switzerland, "Rivers of Joy" entered the Swiss Hitparade at number 25 in the week of 13 May, before climbing to number ten the following week. It spent 14 weeks on the chart. The song also reached number 30 on the Polish Airplay Charts. Altogether, "Rivers of Joy" sold more than 180,000 physical copies.

== Music video ==
The band portraying marble statues in the music video for "Rivers of Joy"

A music video for "Rivers of Joy" was filmed on 26 March 2001. No Angels reteamed with Robert Bröllochs, director of their debut video "Daylight in Your Eyes" (2001), who produced "Rivers of Joy" through his Camelot Filmproduktion. As with their previous video, filming took place at the X-Sight-Studios in Groß-Gerau near Darmstadt and lasted 20 hours. Similar to "Daylight in Your Eyes", most of the sequences in the CGI-heavy video were shot in front of a white background, while several computer animations required shooting in front of a bluescreen. Popstars coach Detlef Soost served as the choreographer again. Due to time constraints, the band was forced to learn his choreography in just six hours.

The visuals depict No Angels as marble statues in a museum of art. When the music starts, they come to life and leave their platforms. They start dancing and singing, and call several animal statues such as lions and elephants into being. The video for "Rivers of Joy" premiered in April 2001 on MTV Central's show Brand:Neu.

== Track listings ==
CD, maxi-single
No.	Title	Writer(s)	Producer(s)	Length
1.	"Rivers of Joy" (Radio Edit)	Hans Andersson; Niklas Petterson	Peter Ries	3:29
2.	"Rivers of Joy" (Extended Mix)	Andersson; Petterson	Ries	5:58
3.	"Rivers of Joy" (Stage Mix)	Andersson; Petterson	Ries	3:59
4.	"Daylight in Your Eyes" (Re-Supreme Mix)	Tony Bruno; Tommy Byrnes	Thorsten Brötzmann; Ries^{[a]}	4:48
5.	"What Am I Supposed to Do"	Harry Zier; Rob Hardt; Senait Mehari	Soul-O-Matic	4:01
6.	"Grußbotschaft" (Voice Message)			1:45

Notes

- ^{^a} denotes additional producer

== Credits and personnel ==
Credits adapted from the liner notes of Elle'ments.

- Nadja Benaissa – vocals
- Robert Bicknell – vocal coaching
- Lucy Diakovska – vocals
- Gina Dunn – background vocals
- Joan Faulkner – background vocals
- Martin Faulwasser – vocal recording
- Trevor Hurst – pro tool editing
- J. Quincy Kramer – mastering
- Dirk Kurock – Pro Tools editing
- Sandy Mölling – vocals
- Vanessa Petruo – vocals
- Peter Ries – production, mixing, recording, instruments
- Ossi Schaller – guitars
- Charlemaine Thomas-Schmidtmer – background vocals
- Jessica Wahls – vocals
- Martin Zehetbauer – recording assistant engineer
- Ulf Zwerger – guitar assistant engineer

== Charts ==
=== Weekly charts ===
Weekly chart performance for "Rivers of Joy"
Chart (2001)	Peak position
Austria (Ö3 Austria Top 40)	11
Europe (Eurochart Hot 100)	35
Germany (GfK)	7
Poland (Polish Airplay Charts)	30
Switzerland (Schweizer Hitparade)	10

=== Year-end charts ===
Year-end chart performance for "Rivers of Joy"
Chart (2001)	Rank
Germany (Media Control)	86
