= Don't Get Me Started (Jess song) =

Single by Jess
- Released: 9 August 2004
- Length: 3:22
- Label: Cheyenne; Polydor Island
- Songwriter(s): Peter Kvint; Emma Holland
- Producer(s): Joakim "Jock-E" Björklund

Jess singles chronology
"Ten Steps Back" (2003)	"Don't Get Me Started" (2004)	"Du bist wie ich" (2005)

"Don't Get Me Started" is a song by German recording artist Jessica Wahls. It was written by Peter Kvint and Emma Holland, and produced by Joakim "Jock-E" Björklund. Her second solo single, it was released by Cheyenne Records and Polydor Island on August 9, 2004, in German-speaking Europe. "Don't Get Me Started" debuted and peaked at number 51 on the German Singles Chart.

== Music video ==
A music video for "Don't Get Me Started" was directed by Katja Kuhla and filmed in and around Split, Croatia. Shooting locations include the Marjan hill, the Old Town as well as the Church of St. Nickolas the Traveler located on the southeastern slope of Marjan Park-Forest. Wahls' daughter Cheyenne as well as her mother Gabriele appear in the visuals.

== Track listings ==
CD single
No.	Title	Writer(s)	Producer(s)	Length
1.	"Don't Get Me Started" (Radio Version)	Peter Kvint; Emma Holland	Joakim "Jock-E" Björklund	3:22
2.	"Don't Get Me Started" (Extended Version)	Kvint; Holland	Björklund	4:33

Enhanced maxi single
No.	Title	Writer(s)	Producer(s)	Length
1.	"Don't Get Me Started" (Radio Version)	Kvint; Holland	Björklund	3:22
2.	"Don't Get Me Started" (Extended Version)	Kvint; Holland	Björklund	4:33
3.	"Move It On"	Jessica Wahls; Niclas Lundin; Thomas Who	Who	3:27
4.	"Don't Get Me Started" (Instrumental Version)	Kvint; Holland	Björklund	3:22
5.	"Don't Get Me Started" (Music video)			3:22

== Personnel and credits ==
Credits adapted from the liner notes of "Don't Get Me Started."

- Helena Gutarra – backing vocals
- Emma Holland – writing
- Peter Kvint – backing vocals, electric guitar, writing
- Joakim "Jock-E" Björklund – instruments, mixing, production
- Pelle Siren – guitar
- Jessica Wahls – backing vocals, lead vocals

== Charts ==
Weekly charts for "Don't Get Me Started"
Chart (2004)	Peak position
Germany (GfK)	51

== Release history ==
"Don't Get Me Started" release history
Region	Date	Format	Label	Ref
Various	9 August 2004	CD single; digital download	Cheyenne	
