= Mama Lilla Would =

Studio album by Vanessa Petruo
- Released: 25 November 2005
- Recorded: 2004–05
- Genres: Pop; Blue-eyed soul; funk
- Length: 64:23
- Label: Universal Island
- Producer: Oja Tunes

Singles from Mama Lilla Would
- 1. "Hot Blooded Woman" Released: 4 November 2005; 2. "Break My Wings" Released: 15 December 2005

Mama Lilla Would is the first album by German singer–songwriter Vanessa Petruo. It differs from her previous work, replacing her indie pop sound with a mixture of soul, funk, alternative rock and baroque pop. It was released on 25 November 2005 by Universal Island. Primarily produced by the Oja Tunes, it failed to enter the top 100 of the German Albums Chart. Its lead single, "Hot Blooded Woman", peaked at #59 on the Media Control Charts. Petruo's previous single, "Drama Queen", which peaked at #11, was not included on the album.

== Background and recording ==
In 2001, Petruo became a member of popular German girl group No Angels, which disbanded in 2003. She was the first member of No Angels to launch a solo career. In 2004, she released her first single, "Drama Queen", which reached #11 in Germany, #35 in Austria and #88 in Switzerland. Another single, "Pop That Melody", produced by Mousse T, was planned. The music video was shot but, like "Drama Queen", it was pulled back due to differences in style with Mama Lilla Would.

In 2004, Petruo wanted to release a pop album with the working title The Faces of Drama. Besides "Drama Queen" and "Pop That Melody", eight more songs were planned for the album: "Army of Me", "Time Has Changed", "Don't Mess With This Latina", "Dear Man in the Moon", "Warrior of Light", "What the Hell Is This?", "Call Dr. Music" and "Wind Me Up". Almost all of these were later uploaded on Petruo's official MySpace page. "What the Hell Is This?" was eventually re–written in a more soul style and became "Hot Blooded Woman", while "What the Hell Is This?" eventually became one of the lines of the new song. "Call Dr. Music" was also included on the album. Originally written as a pop song, it was re–written and arranged as a soul song.

15 songs were recorded for Mama Lilla Would, including "Miss Celie's Blues", written by Lionel Richie and Quincy Jones. Four more songs were recorded but not used: "What God Likes on Me", "Enemy", "I Wish You Love" and "End of the Road", the cover version of Boyz II Men's song. "End of the Road" was included exclusively on the BRAVO: Come Together compilation album. Most of the songs are available on Petruo's MySpace page. Petruo wrote and composed most of the album's songs, helped by several songwriters. Thorsten Brötzmann and Alex Geringas, who wrote "Drama Queen", wrote one song, "Call Dr. Music".

== Critical reception ==
Professional ratings
Review scores
Source	Rating
CDStarts	6/10 stars
LAUT	3/5 stars
Amazon.com	4/5 stars

Though the album was commercially unsuccessful, it was well–received by music critics. The German edition of Amazon.com gave it 4.5 stars out of five. Laut.de gave it three out of five stars, stating that it "had the potential" and describing the song as "original". It also received six out of ten stars at the CDStars.

== Singles ==
- "Hot Blooded Woman" was released on 4 November 2005 as the lead single from the album. Though it garnered positive reviews from music critics, it charted at #59 in the German Singles Chart and remained on the chart for only a week.
- "Break My Wings" was released shortly after "Hot Blooded Woman", but it failed to chart. It was released as a radio single only and a music video was not filmed.

== Track listing ==
No.	Title	Writer(s)	Producer(s)	Length
1.	"Superbad"	Petruo; Otto Block; Jan Paleo; D. Cialfi	Oja Tunes	3:22
2.	"I Don't Need a Gun"	Petruo; Block; Paleo	Oja Tunes	4:03
3.	"Haha, Don't Waste Your Time"	Petruo; Block; Paleo; D. Schulz	Oja Tunes	4:07
4.	"Don't Mama Me!"	Petruo; Block; Paleo; Schulz	Oja Tunes	0:25
5.	"B.B.B"	Petruo; Block; Paleo	Oja Tunes	3:24
6.	"Break My Wings"	Petruo; Block; Paleo	Oja Tunes	5:32
7.	"Did I Lilla You?"	Petruo; Block; Paleo	Oja Tunes	0:44
8.	"Made of Stone"	Petruo; Block; Paleo	Oja Tunes	4:42
9.	"Hot Blooded Woman"	Petruo; Jonas Jeberg; Niclas Lundin	Oja Tunes	3:26
10.	"Cause I Would..."	Petruo; Block; Paleo	Oja Tunes	0:23
11.	"Call Dr. Music"	Petruo; Thorsten Brötzmann; Alex Geringas	Oja Tunes	3:59
12.	"Father"	Petruo; Block; Paleo; Ciafli	Oja Tunes	2:52
13.	"Can't Change It"	Petruo; Block; Paleo	Oja Tunes	4:33
14.	"Why?"	Petruo; Block; Paleo	Oja Tunes	6:08
15.	"Miss Celie's Blues"	Lionel Richie; Quincy Jones	Oja Tunes	3:35
Total length:				64:23
