= Hot Blooded Woman =

Single by Vanessa Petruo

from the album Mama Lilla Would
- Released: 4 November 2005
- Genre: Pop; soul
- Length: 3:26
- Label: Universal Island
- Songwriters: Vanessa Petruo; Niclas Lundin; Jonas Jeberg
- Producer: OJA Tunes

Vanessa Petruo singles chronology
| "Drama Queen" (2005) | "Hot Blooded Woman" (2005) | "Break My Wings" (2006) |

"Hot Blooded Woman" is a song by German recording artist Vanessa Petruo. It was written by Petruo along with Niclas Lundin and Jonas Jeberg for her debut studio album Mama Lilla Would (2005), while production was helmed by OJA Tunes. The uptempo track was released by Universal Island on 4 November 2005 as the lead single from the album. Despite its critical acclaim, the song failed to reprise the commercial success of Petruo's former single "Drama Queen," reaching number 59 at the German Singles Chart.

== Background and writing ==
"Hot Blooded Woman" was written by Jonas Jeberg, Niclas Lundin and Vanessa Petruo herself for her unreleased album in 2004. It was initially written as a pop song, and was named "What the Hell Is This?". However, that album was not released, and the song was rewritten and composed in more latin pop and soul style. "What the Hell Is This?" eventually became one of the lines of a new song, renamed "Hot Blooded Woman". The song was decided to be the lead single for Mama Lilla Would, the debut album by Petruo, released in 2005.

== Track listings ==
CD single
| No. | Title | Length |
|---|---|---|
| 1. | "Hot Blooded Woman" | 3:26 |
| 2. | "I Don't Need a Gun" | 4:00 |
| 3. | "Hot Blooded Woman" (Instrumental) | 3:23 |
| 4. | "Enemy" | 4:17 |

== Charts ==
| Chart (2005) | Peak position |
|---|---|
| Germany (GfK) | 59 |
