= Du bist wie ich =

Single by Jess
- Released: March 7, 2005
- Genre: Pop
- Length: 2:40
- Label: Polydor; Universal
- Songwriters: Diane Weigmann; Till Brönner
- Producers: Till Brönner; Schumann & Bach

Jess singles chronology
"Don't Get Me Started" (2005)	"Du bist wie ich" (2005)	"Bedingungslos" (2005)

"Du bist wie ich" (English: You Are Like Me) is a song by German recording artist Jessica Wahls. It was written by Diane Weigmann and Till Brönner and produced by the latter along with duo Schumann & Bach. Wahls's first German language record, it served as the theme song for the show KiKA LIVE on the KiKa network and was released as the third solo single in March 2005.

== Track listings ==
CD single
No.	Title	Length
1.	"Du bist wie ich" (Single Version)	3:02
2.	"Du bist wie ich" (Instrumental Version)	3:01

Enhanced maxi single
No.	Title	Writer(s)	Length
1.	"Du bist wie ich" (Single Version)		3:02
2.	"Du bist wie ich" (Instrumental Version)		3:01
3.	"Du bist wie ich" (Boomtown Extended Version)		5:27
4.	"Million Miles"	Jessica Wahls; Torsten Stenzel; Adrian Zagoritis	3:42
5.	"Du bist wie ich" (Music video)		3:08

== Personnel and credits ==
Credits adapted from the liner notes of "Du bist wie ich."

- Till Brönner – writing, production
- Schumann & Bach – production
- Jessica Wahls – backing vocals, lead vocals
- Diane Weigmann – writing

== Charts ==
Chart (2005)	Peak position
Germany (GfK)	78
