= Daylight in Your Eyes =

2001 single by No Angels

Single by No Angels

from the album Elle'ments
- Released: 5 February 2001
- Recorded: 2000
- Studio: Park (Tutzing, Germany)
- Length: 3:30
- Label: Cheyenne; Polydor; Zeitgeist
- Songwriters: Tony Bruno; Tommy Byrne
- Producer: Thorsten Brötzmann

No Angels singles chronology
"Daylight in Your Eyes" (2001)	"Rivers of Joy" (2001)

Audio sample
- file; help

"Daylight in Your Eyes" is the debut single by German girl group No Angels. It was written by Tony Bruno and Tommy Byrnes and initially recorded by American rock band New Life Crisis. A Tony Moran-produced remix of their version appeared on MTV Party to Go Remixed (2001), but as their record company, Tommy Boy Entertainment, folded soon after, the group's original recording failed to receive a wider release, and the song was eventually sold separately abroad. There, "Daylight in Your Eyes" was purchased by Epic Records and re-recorded by the singer Victoria Faiella for her debut album with the label.

In 2001, Faiella's producer Peter Plate offered the newly created pop group No Angels, winners of the debut season of the German adaption of Popstars, to re-record "Daylight in Your Eyes" for their debut studio album, Elle'ments (2001), following their participation in the first installment of the German edition of the reality television program Popstars. Released as the group's debut single on 5 February 2001 in German-speaking Europe and the following months in the United Kingdom and the United States, the single became a major international success, reaching number one in Austria, Germany and Switzerland.

"Daylight in Your Eyes" was the best-selling single of the year 2001 in Germany as well as the third-best-selling single in Austria, and became fifth-highest-selling single of the 2000s in Germany. It was nominated for an Amadeus Austrian Music Award and awarded both the 2001 Top of the Pops Award for Top Single Germany and the 2002 ECHO Award for Single of the Year (National). "Daylight in Your Eyes" received a Platinum certification from the Bundesverband Musikindustrie (BVMI) for shipping half a million copies and has since been covered by various artists.

== Background ==
"Daylight in Your Eyes" was composed by songwriters and guitarists Tony Bruno and Tommy Byrnes, and initially intended to appear on the self-titled debut album of American rock band New Life Crisis, their debut with Tommy Boy Records. Recorded in 2000, their rendition received a limited release in the United States, and ended on various sampler albums such as the MTV Party to Go Remixed compilation (2001). Plans for an international release however fell through as Bruno and Byrnes had sold the appropriate license rights of song separately, both stateside and abroad, and the label lacked the right to release the band's version on any format throughout Europe. Further problems arose as Byrnes, Bruno, and the publishing company that bought the rights to the song were forced to not only acknowledge the writing contribution of New Life Crisis leader Paul Mahos, but to also pay him back and continuing royalties.

Meanwhile, Bruno met New York City singer Victoria Faiella when they were working as background musicians on Spanish singer Enrique Iglesias' 1999 Cosas del Amor World Tour. Following a concert, he introduced her to German producer Peter Plate, one half of the musical duo Rosenstolz, who later became instrumental in her signing with the German division of Epic Records. The pair soon began work on Faiella's debut album Drama, with sessions also resulting into a re-recording of Bruno's "Daylight." Faiella's uplifiting, "poppier" version, produced by Bruno, Plate and his partner Ulf Leo Sommer, was eventually selected as her debut single with the record company. In summer 2000, an accompanying music video was filmed and sent to German music networks, but as the record lacked general airplay support, it underperformed and the singer was eventually dropped from her label.

== Recording and reception ==
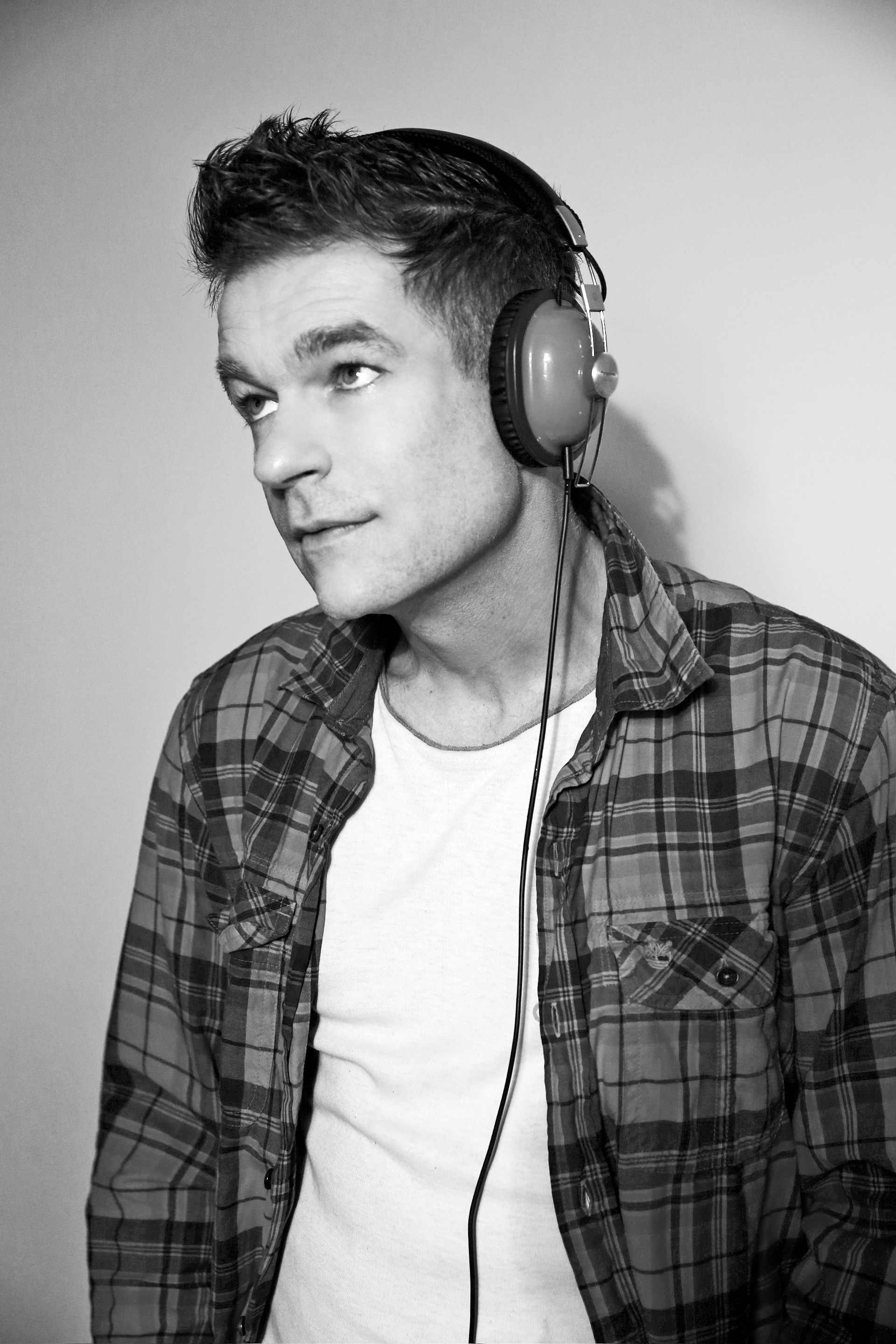
Peter Plate was instrumental in disposing "Daylight".

Following the termination of Faiella's contract with Epic, the rights to her songs were returned to Plate and Sommer. A few months later, Plate got known that Polydor Records, RTL II network and production company Tresor TV were searching songs for a girl band, the soon-to-be-cast result of the inaugural season of Popstars, the German adaptation of the international reality show of the same name. Submitted by Plate, Faiella's version of "Daylight" found general approval among the members of the newly formed No Angels, and became one of several songs they recorded for their debut album Elle'ments (2001). While Plate, Sommer and Bruno received proper credit, recording and production duties were acceded by Thorsten Brötzmann, one of the main producers on Elle'ments. Mixing of the song was overseen by Joachim "Jeo" Mezei. Re-titled "Daylight in Your Eyes", No Angels' version made no significant changes to Faiella's backing track.

After their formation, there was a period of indecision about what song would be released as No Angels' debut single. Cheyenne Records executives believed that the first single should be "Go Ahead and Take It", which had previously been promoted during the Popstars re-call sessions on Mallorca, while the group was adamant that their debut song should be "Daylight in Your Eyes". The executives at Cheyenne relented, and the song was chosen as their first single out of a total of ten songs that had been pre-selected to lead the parent album. Upon release, "Daylight in Your Eyes" received generally mixed reviews from music critics. Billboard magazine editor Chuck Taylor called the song "an ideal illustration of bouncy, gleeful bubble gum, tailor-made for the tween set." He felt that "the group's harmonies are equally beaming and the exhilarating production is perfectly suited to the spirit of the chorus."

== Commercial performance ==
In Germany, "Daylight in Your Eyes" entered the German Airplay Chart at number one one week before the release of the physical single. The CD single was released on 5 February 2001, following 130,000 advance orders. The exceptionally high demand prompted retailers to place a further 200,000 orders shortly after its release. The single was certified gold by the Bundesverband Musikindustrie (BVMI) within 24 hours of release and reached platinum status four days later, with estimated first-week sales at more than 500,000 copies. Universal Music subsequently described it as the fastest-selling single in the company's history at the time. Contemporary reports likewise characterized it as the fastest-selling single in Germany since Elton John's 1997 version of "Candle in the Wind." A week later, the song debuted at number one on the German Singles Chart, where it remained for six consecutive weeks. Its rapid sales continued throughout the following weeks, with more than 780,000 copies sold within its first three weeks, and more than 900,000 by mid-April. With more than one million copies shipped to German retailers, it became Germany’s best-selling single of 2001 and was later recognized as one of the most successful German singles of the 2000s.

The single also replicated its success across other German-speaking music markets, including Luxembourg and Liechtenstein. In Switzerland, "Daylight in Your Eyes" debuted at number one and spent six weeks atop the Swiss Singles Chart, while being certified gold by the International Federation of the Phonographic Industry (IFPI) for shipments of 20,000 units. It eventually ranked number 12 on the Swiss year-end singles chart. In Austria, it debuted at number four on the Ö3 Austria Top 40 before reaching number one three weeks later, where it remained for four consecutive weeks. The single was certified platinum for shipments of 40,000 units and ultimately ranked as the country's third-best-selling single of 2001, behind Kylie Minogue's "Can't Get You Out of My Head" and Gigi D'Agostino's "Super (1, 2, 3)". The song's dominance extended to airplay in both Austria and Switzerland, as reflected in the composite GSA airplay chart. "Daylight in Your Eyes" debuted at number 11 on the composite GSA airplay chart in the week of 24 February 2001, before reaching number one on 17 March and remaining there for five consecutive weeks.

Outside the GSA region, "Daylight in Your Eyes" achieved more moderate commercial results. Around the time of its release in Germany, the song also reached number 18 on the Polish Airplay Chart. In July 2001, it entered the Brazilian singles market and subsequently reached number one on the Pop Internacional chart in August. According to various reports, the song also topped the charts in Estonia. From October 2001, the single was released in several additional markets, including France, the United Kingdom and the United States. Its commercial performance in these markets was more modest, peaking at number 80 on the French Singles Chart, number 89 on the UK Singles Chart, and number 36 on the Billboard Hot Singles Sales chart, respectively. On a compositive European Hot 100 chart, "Daylight in Your Eyes" debuted at number 19 in the week of 24 February 2001, before rising to and peaking at number three the following week as this week's sales breaker. The same week, the song made its debut on the European Radio Top 50, reaching number 50, It eventually peaked at number 40 three weeks later.

== Music video ==
=== Original version ===
In the video, each of the five girls represents a different element.

An accompanying music video for "Daylight in Your Eyes" was directed by Robert Bröllochs and filmed at the X-Sight-Studios in Groß-Gerau near Darmstadt, Hesse, on 22 December 2000. Also produced by Bröllochs for his Camelot Filmproduktionen, cinematography was helmed by Jason West. Popstars coach Detlef "D!" Soost with whom the band had worked during the casting process, handled the video's choreography. Shot in a time span of 17 hours, it is primarily composed of individual close shots and dance sequences using split screen and bluescreen technique. The final video cut for "Daylight in Your Eyes" premiered in January 2001 at the end of its making of episode on the first installment of Popstars.

The video does not have a substantial plot, but as both the band's management and their label attempted to introduce aliases assigning each member of the group—similar to the Spice Girls pseudonyms—in due consideration of the polysemous title of the band's debut album, Elle'ments, focus is on the personalization of the classical elements. While Nadja Benaissa ("Air"), Lucy Diakovska ("Fire"), Sandy Mölling ("Water"), and Vanessa Petruo ("Earth") incorporated one of the four archetypal type images for each themselves, a fifth element ("Spirit") was specially created for Jessica Wahls because of a lack of another element. The band later dismissed the video for its styling and make-up, both of which was widely influenced by the element theme and, according to Benaissa, made them look like a group of "five casted whores".

=== North American version ===
Following its major success in German-speaking Europe, MCA Records agreed on releasing "Daylight in Your Eyes" in North America. As with in Europe, MCA planned to promote the band primarily within the teenage/college-aged fan demographic with the intention to establish them as teen stars. However, since Bröllochs' video for "Daylight in Your Eyes" was considered too "sexy and provocative" due to its dancing routines and outifts to be broadcast on Disney Channel and other children's television networks in the United States, the quintet was forced to film a more family-friendly music video for the North American music market. MCA hired Canadian music director Stephen Scott to film a second version, with Soost reprising his position as choreographer. Filming took place in Toronto in April 2001 and lasted 14 hours. Set in a park, the US version for "Daylight in Your Eyes" abandons the classical elements topic of the original video in favor of performance and dancing routines. Solo scenes were filmed on a rotating platform.

== Cover versions ==
Following the success of No Angels' interpretation of "Daylight in Your Eyes" the song has been covered by several artists. Among both versions by Victoria Faiella and New Life Crisis, German band Audiosmog released a rock version of the song, featuring Tobias Schlegl, as a single, which reached number 36 on the German Singles Chart in 2001. In addition, the track has been re-recorded by heavy metal band Lakehurst, German-South African singer Howard Carpendale, and Stefan Raab's studio band Herb & The Heavytones. Rockabilly band Boppin'B covered the song on their 2003 studio album 42. In January 2021, German singers Nico Santos and Lea covered "Daylight in Your Eyes" on Santo's Nico Santos Karaoke Box webseries. In January 2024, German musician Alligatoah released a heavy metal-influenced rendition of "Daylight in Your Eyes."

== Celebration Version ==
"Daylight in Your Eyes"

Single by No Angels

from the album 20
- Released: 12 February 2021
- Length: 3:31
- Label: BMG
- Songwriters: Tony Bruno; Tommy Byrne
- Producer: Christian Geller

No Angels singles chronology
"One Life" (2009)	"Daylight in Your Eyes" (2021)	"Still in Love with You" (2021)

=== Background ===
In late 2020, BMG Rights Management acquired the catalog of No Angels' former record label Cheyenne Records, including more than 600 master recordings from bands and solo artists who emerged from the Popstars series between 2000 and 2010. On 27 November 2020, following their absence from digital streaming platforms for five years, the band's backup catalog from 2000 to 2004 was issued online, accompanied by a digital campaign as well as the release of high-quality versions of their original official music videos and a physical re-release of "Daylight in Your Eyes". Released to strong streaming numbers, a revived interest from the media and their fan base prompted Benaissa, Diakovska, Mölling and Wahls to launch an official Instagram account through which they began sharing private photos and hosted several livestreams in the weeks following. As with their 2007 reformation, original member Vanessa Petruo rejected to join in for promotional activities, citing her wish to stay out of the public eye following a professional reorientation.

=== Release ===
While the quartet denied plans for a much-speculated reunion at first, in January 2021, tabloid newspaper Bild reported, that Benaissa, Diakovska, Mölling and Wahls were planning a comeback, with the intention to re-record some material of their catalog as a foursome. On 5 February 2021, BMG released a lyric video for the original version of "Daylight in Your Eyes" on YouTube, commemorating with its 2001 release. The following week, it was announced that the band would reunite for a performance on Schlagerchampions 2021 on 27 Februar 2021, followed by the accouncement of the release of a 'Celebration Version' of "Daylight in Your Eyes," featuring all-new vocals. Produced by Christian Geller, with whom the band had previously worked on their second album Now... Us! (2002), it was recorded separately in Bulgaria, Germany, and Los Angeles due to the COVID-19 pandemic and eventually released on 12 February 2021.

=== Chart performance ===
Upon release of the Celebration Version, "Daylight in Your Eyes" re-entered the German Singles Chart at number 74, combining streaming and song downloads of both the 2001 version and the 2021 version. This marked the song's first appearance after almost exactly twenty years as well as its 16th week on the chart. The same week, "Daylight in Your Eyes" also debuted on the German Download Chart, reaching number six.

=== Music video ===
Benaissa, Wahls, Diakovska and Mölling in the opening shot of "Daylight in Your Eyes (Celebration Version)"

A music video for the Celebration Version of "Daylight in Your Eyes" was directed by Franz Leibinger and filmed in Cologne on 20–21 February 2021. The band's first clip since "One Life" (2009), the concept for the video was pitched by creative team Army of Love Entertainment. Choreography was overseen by Violetta Kromer and Camillo Lauricella, with assistance from Sarah Hammerschmidt. Due to the COVID-19 pandemic and its related restrictions, No Angels were forced to learn large portions of their choreography virtually through Zoom before their first meeting in Cologne in February 2021. There, the band went through ten days of intensive training sessions in preparation for the video shoot as well as their first live performance of "Daylight in Your Eyes (Celebration Version)". The costumes in the video were designed by Sascha Gaugel who died late into pre-production of the clip. Post-production on the CGI-heavy visuals which were largely filmed in front of a greenscreen, was helmed by Leibinger's Filmklub Entertainment. The video world premiered on 10 March 2021 on RTL.de.

The visuals depict No Angels as four goddess-like beings from different universes that reunite for a performance. While not a remake of the original video with its references to the classicals elements, the Celebration Version of "Daylight in Your Eyes" contains several anecdotes to the 2001 version. It begins with a shot of a violet colored peculiar galaxy, followed by a close-up of Benaissa, Wahls, Diakovska and Mölling, all dressed in metal coloured sequin dresses. The first lines are sung by Diakovska, who is seen standing under a glowing triangle against a dark starry sky, surrounded by a wave-shaped pink cloud. The video then shifts to Benaissa who is seated in a giant scallop shell, followed by Wahls who is lying on a pink cloud in front of a glowing rhombus. Finally, Mölling is seen floating in a ring of boulders. Beginning with the second verse, the video shifts to several dancing routines that were filmed in a room covered with aluminum foil and in the middle of a large warehouse. When the bridge sets in, the foursome, dressed in beige or either brown latex suits, performs a dance break sequence in an ankle-deep basin that is flooded with water. The video ends with a shot of them holding hands.

=== Track listings ===
Digital single
No.	Title	Writer(s)	Producer(s)	Length
1.	"Daylight in Your Eyes" (Celebration Version)	Bruno; Byrne	Christian Geller	3:31

== Track listings ==
CD, maxi-single
No.	Title	Writer(s)	Producer(s)	Length
1.	"Daylight in Your Eyes" (Radio Version)	Tony Bruno; Tommy Byrne	Thorsten Brötzmann	3:30
2.	"Daylight in Your Eyes" (Extended Version)	Bruno; Byrne	Brötzmann	5:03
3.	"Daylight in Your Eyes" (Instrumental Version)	Bruno; Byrne	Brötzmann	3:30

UK enhanced CD single
No.	Title	Writer(s)	Producer(s)	Length
1.	"Daylight in Your Eyes" (Radio Version)	Bruno; Byrne	Brötzmann	3:33
2.	"Daylight in Your Eyes" (WIP "Wonderkins" Remix)	Bruno; Byrne	Brötzmann; Work in Progress^{[a]}	6:23
3.	"100% Emotional"	Johan Aberg; Paul Rein; Winston Sela	Peter Ries	3:01
4.	"Daylight in Your Eyes" (CD-Rom Video of US Promo)	Bruno; Byrne	Brötzmann	4:30

Notes

- ^{^a} denotes additional producer

== Credits and personnel ==
Credits lifted from the liner notes of Elle'ments.

- Nadja Benaissa – vocals
- Thorsten Brötzmann – keyboards, producer
- Tony Bruno – original arranger, writer
- Tommy Byrnes – writer
- Ludmilla Diakovska – vocals
- Nico Fintzen – keyboards
- Stefan Hansen – keyboards
- Joachim "Jeo" Mezei – mixing
- J. Quincy Kramer – mastering
- Sandy Mölling – vocals
- Vanessa Petruo – vocals
- Peter Plate – original arranger
- Ulf Leo Sommer – original arranger
- Mike "Spike" Streefkerk – vocal recording
- Jessica Wahls – vocals
- Peter Weihe – guitars

== Charts ==
=== Weekly charts ===
Weekly chart performance for "Daylight in Your Eyes"
Chart (2001)	Peak position
Austria (Ö3 Austria Top 40)	1
Brazil (Pop Internacional)	1
Europe (Eurochart Hot 100)	3
France (SNEP)	80
Germany (GfK)	1
Poland Airplay (Music & Media)	18
Switzerland (Schweizer Hitparade)	1
UK Singles (Official Charts)	89
US Hot Singles Sales (Billboard)	36

=== Year-end charts ===
Year-end chart performance for "Daylight in Your Eyes"
Chart (2001)	Position
Austria (Ö3 Austria Top 40)	3
Brazil (Crowley)	12
Europe (European Hot 100 Singles)	54
Germany (Media Control)	1
Switzerland (Schweizer Hitparade)	12

=== Decade-end charts ===
Decade-end chart performance for "Daylight in Your Eyes"
Chart (2000–2010)	Position
Austria (Ö3 Austria Top 40)	28

== Certifications ==
Certifications for "Daylight in Your Eyes"
Region	Certification	Certified units/sales
Austria (IFPI Austria)	Platinum	40,000^{*}
Germany (BVMI)	Platinum	900,000
Switzerland (IFPI Switzerland)	Gold	20,000^{^}
^{*} Sales figures based on certification alone.^{^} Shipments figures based on certification alone.

== Release history ==
Release dates and formats for "Daylight in Your Eyes"
Region	Date	Format	Label	Edition(s)	Ref
Austria	5 February 2001	CD single	Poyldor; Zeitgeist; Cheyenne	Standard	
Germany	5 February 2001	CD single	Poyldor; Zeitgeist; Cheyenne	Standard	
Switzerland	5 February 2001	CD single	Poyldor; Zeitgeist; Cheyenne	Standard	
United States	17 July 2001	CD single	MCA	Standard	
Estonia	1 October 2001	CD single	Polydor	Standard	
France	1 October 2001	CD single	Polydor	Standard	
United Kingdom	1 October 2001	CD single	Polydor	Standard	
Various	12 February 2021	Digital download; streaming	BMG	Celebration Version	

== See also ==
- List of number-one hits of 2001 (Austria)
- List of number-one hits of 2001 (Germany)
- List of number-one hits of 2001 (Switzerland)
