= Heart of Fire (2009 film) =

- Directed by: Luigi Falorni
- Written by: Luigi Falorni; Gabriele Kister; Senait Mehari
- Produced by: Sven Burgemeister; Andreas Bariess; Gloria Burket
- Starring: Letekidan Micael; Solomie Micael; Seble Tilahun; Daniel Seyoum; Mekdes Wegene; Samuel Semere
- Edited by: Anja Pohl
- Music by: Andrea Guerra; Stephan Massimo
- Distributed by: Beta Film
- Release date: 25 September 2009
- Running time: 97 minutes
- Countries: Eritrea; Germany; United Kingdom
- Languages: Tigrinya; Italian; English
- Budget: $5.5 million

Heart of Fire (also known by its original German name, Feuerherz) is a 2009 German docudrama which was directed by Luigi Falorni. The film was inspired by the best selling book of Ethiopian-German singer Senait Mehari of the same name. The film was released on September 25 (Germany) and October 10 (United Kingdom, Italy, Eritrea).

== Plot ==
Awet (Letekidan Micael) is born the daughter of an Eritrean man and an Ethiopian woman - a bad combination in 1974, in the middle of a long liberation war between the two peoples. Asmara is under Ethiopian occupation, and Awet's father takes to the woods with the Eritrean freedom fighters. Left alone and needy, Awet's mother attempts to kill her, locking it away in a suitcase. Awet survives and is taken to a Catholic orphanage ran by Italian and Eritrean nuns. It is during her time in the orphanage that Awet begins to first perceive the injustice all around her, and gradually learns to stand up for her beliefs. Six years later, her father - whom she believed lost - takes her away to live with his new family. But Awet is not welcome; her father torments her and finally gives her and her elder stepsister to the “Morning Stars” - a children's unit within one of Eritrea's liberation armies, the Eritrean Liberation Front, also known as Jebha.

It's here that Awet finds a new family and a mother substitute in the commander Ma'aza: a beautiful and charismatic young woman who has made her way to one of the leading positions, typically occupied by men. Awet falls for her, and tries anything to catch her attention and win her favour. She endures paramilitary training and the harshness of guerrilla life in the dry Eritrean desert, waiting for the moment she’ll fight at the commander’s side. But then Awet encounters the first dead bodies: enemies and comrades lying side by side. In her eyes, the dead friends and foes all look shockingly alike - children like her. So when Ma'aza gives her the long-desired Kalashnikov, Awet shirks the drill and pretends to shoot, but with an empty magazine; she even buries her gun. She gets punished, mocked as a coward and isolated. But her refusal to kill and her naïve questioning set a troublesome precedent - a challenge to Ma'aza’s authority.

Meanwhile losses to the enemy - the Eritrean People's Liberation Front or Shabia - increase and the enemy tightens the circle. A few of Awet’s comrades are caught while fleeing and are killed at Ma'aza’s command. In a final clash with the enemy, the commander calls her fighters to the last sacrifice. But Awet takes control of her destiny this time. She confronts Ma'aza and finally leaves her former idol to her fate. While the troops are breaking apart, Awet is able to save herself and her stepsister - hiding in an abandoned suitcase.

== Cast ==
- Letekidan Micael as Awet
- Solomie Micael as Freweyni
- Seble Tilahun as Ma'aza
- Daniel Seyoum as Mike'ele
- Mekdes Wegene as Amrit
- Saniel Samara as Haile
- Kybra Negash as Anna

== Reception ==
Heart of Fire received generally positive reviews; on Rotten Tomatoes, the film holds an 83% 'fresh' rating, with the consensus "beautifully shot and emotionally engaging". It was nominated for the International Film Critics Award at the 2010 Los Angeles International Film Festival. However, the film has caused a lot of controversy and has come in for considerable criticism as to accuracy. The Eritrean government has attacked the film producers and author Senait Mehari, denying that there were child soldiers involved during the war for independence.

== See also ==
- Eritrean Civil War
- Eritrean War for Independence
