= Joakim "Jock-E" Björklund =

Swedish musician

Joakim "Jock-E" Björklund (born in Stockholm, Sweden on March 11, 1965) is a Swedish songwriter and producer.

Raised in Lycksele, Sweden, Joakim Björklund moved to Stockholm in 1987 to pursue a music career. In 1991 he started the production team T.O.E.C. with Sören von Malmborg. Their big break came with producing Ace of Base’s first hit single “Wheel of fortune” as well as the song "Voulez-Vous Danser" on Ace of Base's debut album “Happy Nation”. As a part of T.O.E.C. he later went on to produce and remix for platinum selling acts like Human League and Pandora.

In 1998 Björklund's club project Night Vision peaked on No. 2 on the UK club charts and No. 13 on the US Billboard club chart with the song “Ready for the weekend”. In 1999 he was signed to the Stockholm-based music production company Murlyn Music Group.

Björklund has written and produced for international acts like Holly Valance, Dannii Minogue, Jennifer Paige, Lene Nystrøm, Thomas Anders, and Sertab. With his regular writing partners The Nervo Twins he has written the b-single “In Stereo” for Japanese Kana Nishino.

In 2005 Björklund was signed to EMI Music Publishing Scandinavia.
