= Drama Queen (Vanessa Petruo song) =

Single by Vanessa Petruo
- Released: 26 April 2004
- Genre: Pop; dance pop
- Length: 3:35
- Label: Polydor; Cheyenne
- Songwriter(s): Vanessa Petruo; Thorsten Brötzmann; Alex Geringas
- Producer(s): Brötzmann

Vanessa Petruo singles chronology
"Drama Queen" (2004)	"Hot Blooded Woman" (2005)

"Drama Queen" is a song by German pop singer Vanessa Petruo. Written by Petruo, Alexander Geringas, and Thorsten Brötzmann, it was released by Polydor and Cheyenne Records on 26 April 2004 as Petruo's first solo single following the disbandment of her group No Angels in fall 2003. The pop song achieved moderate success on the charts, peaking at number eleven in Germany, number 35 in Austria and number 88 in Switzerland. "Drama Queen" marked Petruo's only release with the label and her former No Angels management.

== Track listings ==
CD single
No.	Title	Length
1.	"Drama Queen" (Radio/Video Edit)	3:35
2.	"Drama Queen" (Club Mix)	3:32
3.	"Drama Queen" (Extended Mix)	4:11
4.	"Drama Queen" (Karaoke Mix)	3:28

== Personnel ==
Credits adapted from the liner notes of "Drama Queen".

- Vanessa Petruo – vocals, lyrics
- Thorsten Brötzmann – lyrics, production, keyboards
- Alexander Geringas – lyrics, keyboards
- Jeo – mixing
- Christoph Leis-Bendorff – choir arrangement
- Anya Mahnken – choir arrangement
- Nightshift – production (remix)
- Peter Weihe – guitar

== Charts ==
Chart (2004)	Peak position
Austria (Ö3 Austria Top 40)	35
Germany (GfK)	11
Switzerland (Schweizer Hitparade)	88
