= Popstars (German TV series) season 1 =

Popstars
- Season 1
- Starring: No Angels; Simone Angel; Rainer Moslener; Mario M. Mendryzcki; Detlef "D!" Soost
- No. of episodes: 17

Release
- Original release: 14 November 2000 – 6 March 2001

In fall 2000, German television network RTL2 started with the production of a German adaptation of Popstars. Over the course of three months more than 4,500 hopeful female singers attended open television auditions in Hamburg, Berlin, Frankfurt, Leipzig, Cologne, Oberhausen, Stuttgart and Munich. Judged by Dutch entertainer Simone Angel, booker Mario M. Mendryzcki and Rainer Moslener, a director of A&R, thirty-two out of two hundred pre-selected girls eventually made it from the local recall shows to Majorca, Spain, to get trained in singing, dancing, and fitness. While the judges continued eliminating two or three girls each day with the help of choreographer Detlef "D!" Soost, eleven finalists remained and were sent home to prepare. In November 2000, Angel and Moslener visited each of the contestants at home to reveal whether or not they had been selected for the band. In the end five girls made it into the band: Nadja Benaissa, Lucy Diakovska, Sandy Mölling, Vanessa Petruo and Jessica Wahls. With the final members of the group in place, Popstars continued tracking the development and struggles of the new band.

== Episodes ==
=== Episode 1: The Casting I ===
First Aired: 14 November 2000

=== Episode 2: The Casting II ===
First Aired: 21 November 2000

=== Episode 3: Recall ===
First Aired: 28 November 2000

=== Episode 4: Re-Recall + Telephone Callbacks ===
First Aired: 5 December 2000

=== Episode 5: The Workshop I ===
First Aired: 12 December 2000
Disqualified in training: Katja
Eliminated: Abir, Peggy, Stefanie

=== Episode 6: The Workshop II ===
First Aired: 19 December 2000
Eliminated: Allison, Asia, Ji-In Cho, Juana

=== Episode 7: The Workshop III ===
First Aired: 26 December 2000
Eliminated: Anke, Hariklia, Susan, Sushi

=== Episode 8: The Visits: Who Makes The Band? + Band Haus I ===
First Aired: 2 January 2001
Eliminated: Christiane Feist, Corinna "Curly" Riti, Franziska Frank, Maja Belger, Rachel Colley, Verena Stanley
In the Band: Jessica Wahls, Lucy Diakovska, Nadja Benaissa, Sandy Mölling, Vanessa Petruo

=== Episode 9: Band Haus II ===
First Aired: 9 January 2001

The girls practise their first single in a studio, take dance-lessons but don't like their coach. For one day they are coached by another dance-teacher, who is introduced as their new main-coach later. Simone visits the band to talk about styling and types. She tells that every girl stands for one element. After the meeting they drive to a radio station where the name of the band is revealed: No Angels.

=== Episode 10: Band Haus III ===
First Aired: 16 January 2001

Make-overs and video...

=== Episode 11: Band Haus IV ===
First Aired: 23 January 2001

mouse in the house...

=== Episode 12: Band Haus V ===
First Aired: 30 January 2001

=== Episode 13: Band Haus VI ===
First Aired: 6 February 2001

=== Episode 14: Band Haus VII ===
First Aired: 13 February 2001

=== Episode 15: Band Haus VIII ===
First Aired: 20 February 2001

=== Episode 16: Band Haus IX ===
First Aired: 27 February 2001

=== Episode 17: Band Haus X ===
First Aired: 6 March 2001

== Television ratings ==
Germany

Episode	from 3 years		14-to-49-year-old	
Episode	Viewers (in millions)	Share (in %)	Viewers (in millions)	Share (in %)
Series	1.7			
