= Senait Mehari =

Eritrean-born German singer

Senait Mehari is an Ethiopian-born German writer and singer. She goes professionally by her single name "Senait" as well.

== Biography ==
She was born c. 1974 in Asmera, in what was then the Ethiopian province of Eritrea, to an Eritrean father and Ethiopian mother.When she was six years old, her father sent her and her two elder half-sisters to the Eritrean Liberation Front as "Students of the Revolution." Three years later, her uncle took the three girls to Sudan, where they lived with him for four years. When Senait was twelve years old, her father, who had emigrated to Hamburg, Germany, sent for them. She also wrote a sequel, Wüstenlied („Desert Song”), about her visit to Eritrea. It was published in May 2006.

She released her first album, Mein Weg („My Way”) on November 11, 2005. The first single Hey Du („Hey, You”) is a romantic song. The theme of the album is autobiographical –the song Wenn die Nacht („When the Night”)- is about her dead grandmother; Kap Gheza is about a child who feels unloved, and Libbey is a love story.

Her autobiography Feuerherz ("Heart of Fire") was published in 2004. In February 2007, the 'Zapp' TV show on Germany's NDR channel accused Senait of fabricating some of its contents, notably that she served as a child soldier in Eritrea. She denies the allegations. The book has been translated into several languages. A homonyme film adaptation has been released in 2009.

== Music career ==
She worked as a songwriter and background singer before launching her own career. Inside Germany her singles Leben/Aura became big hits in Germany in 2001. Aura was re-released early 2005 in new versions before of the release of her album. A nice tune, called Hiwet is available from her website feuerherz. Her song Herz aus Eis ("Heart of Ice") placed fourth in the German preselection for the Eurovision Song Contest of 2003.

== Personal life ==
Senait is now living in Berlin.
