= Peter Ries =

German record producer and musician

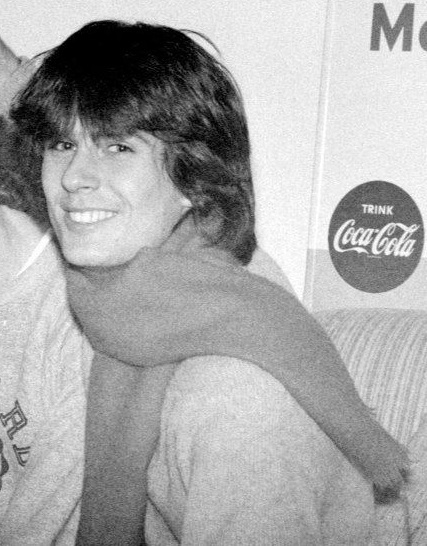

Background information
- Origin: Wiesbaden, Hesse, Germany
- Genres: Pop, Europop
- Occupations: Record producer, composer, arranger, remixer
- Instruments: Keyboards, programming
- Years active: 1980–present
- Label: Ries Production
- Website: www.peterries.com

Peter Ries (also known as Marc Cassandra, Gilbert or Steve Hall) is a German record producer, composer, arranger and remixer.

Ries started his career as a singer in 1980 under the nickname Gilbert. Following collaborations with Sandra and Sally Oldfield, he produced singles with 'N Sync, Kylie Minogue, Love Inc., Eros Ramazzotti, No Angels, Bro'Sis, Joana Zimmer, Thomas Anders, Xavier Naidoo, Kool & the Gang, Mr. President, Enigma and several DSDS candidates including Juliette Schoppmann and Mike Leon Grosch.

== Selected production discography ==
=== Top ten singles ===
Year	Title	Artist
1998	"Broken Bones"	Love Inc.
1999	"You're a Superstar"	Love Inc.
2001	"Rivers of Joy"	No Angels
2001	"When the Angels Sing"	No Angels
2003	"Calling You"	Juliette Schoppmann
2004	"I Still Believe"	Juliette Schoppmann
