= Vanessa Petruo =

German pop singer

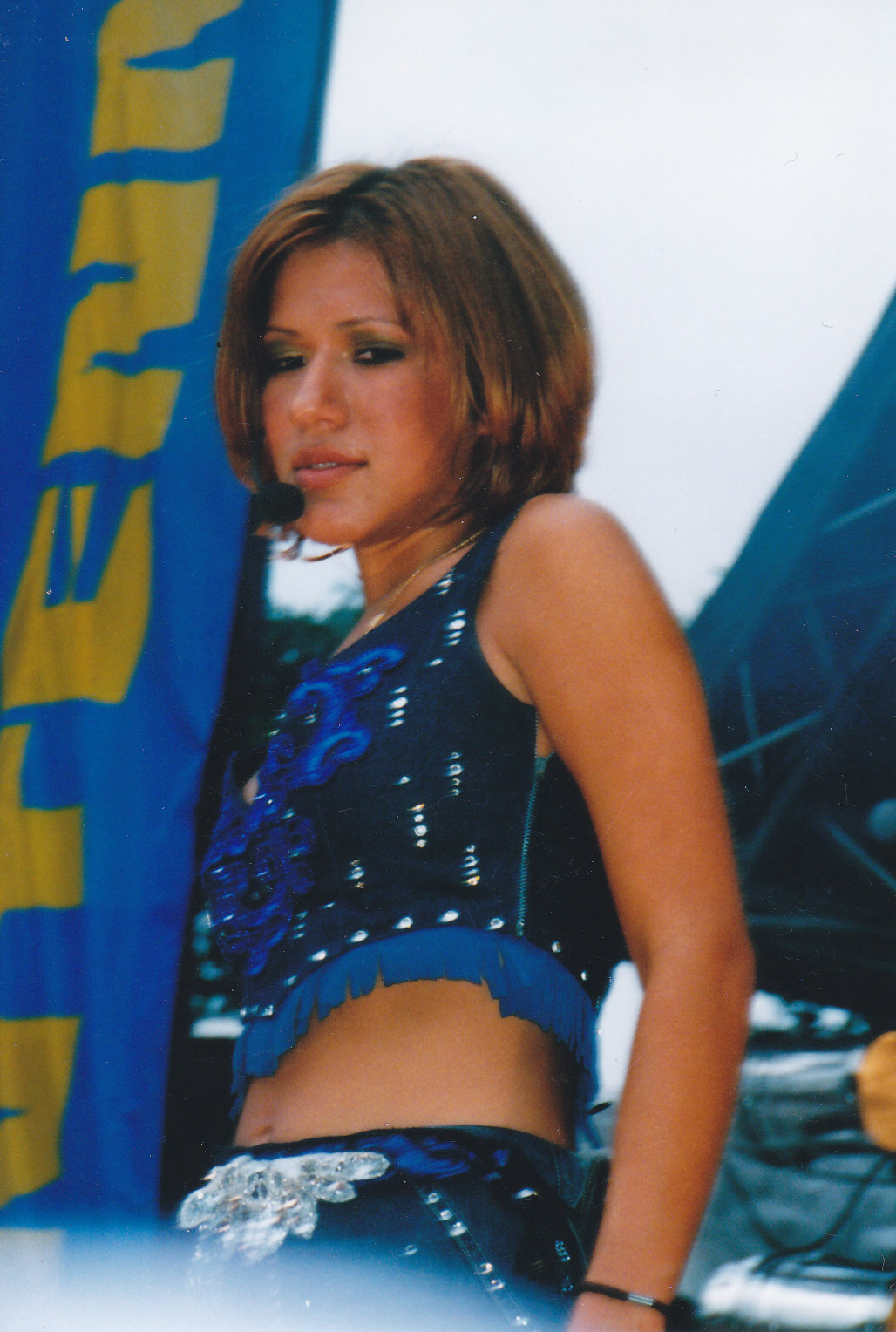
- Petruo with No Angels in 2001

Background information
- Born: 23 October 1979 (age 47); West Berlin, West Germany
- Genres: Pop, soul, alternative rock
- Occupations: Singer, songwriter, actress
- Years active: 2000–2009
- Formerly of: No Angels

Vanessa Anneliese Petruo-Zink (born 23 October 1979) is a German former singer, songwriter, actress and television personality. Born and raised in Berlin within a family of actors, she had minor roles in television and as a voice actress before she rose to fame as one of the members of the girl group No Angels, which were formed in 2000 on the German television talent show Popstars, becoming one of the best-selling girl groups of European origin of all time. Throughout her musical career, Petruo scored four number-one hits, including "Something About Us", which she co-wrote, and sold over five million albums and singles worldwide.

Following her departure, Petruo scored a top 20 hit with her solo debut single "Drama Queen" and released her only solo album, Mama Lilla Would (2005) to major critical but minor commercial success. In addition, she lent her voice to several animation films such as Dr. Dolittle 2 (2001), Lilo & Stitch (2002), and Boo, Zino & the Snurks (2004) and starred in the RTL action series Wilde Engel as well as the comedy film Where Is Fred? (2006). While she continued working as a songwriter throughout the late 2000s, further musical projects failed to materialize, and she retired from the recording business in favor of an academic career.

== Early life ==
Petruo was born on 23 October 1979 in West Berlin. Her mother Mercedes, a Spanish-Peruvian, owned a salsa nightclub in Berlin-Charlottenburg, and her father Thomas Petruo (1956–2018) was a radio host and actor, best known as the German voice of Plankton in SpongeBob SquarePants and Biff Tannen in Back to the Future. Petruo has two younger siblings, Jon Alexander and Priszilla. Her grandfather, Heinz Petruo (1918–2001), was a famous radio show host for RIAS and also worked as a voice actor, best known as the German dub of Darth Vader in the Star Wars saga. Petruo attended Katholische Schule Sankt Paulus in Berlin-Moabit as well as Liebfrauen-Gymnasium in Berlin-Westend.

Influenced by her father, Petruo herself began dubbing films as a child. Aged twelve, she started taking singing lessons. In her teenage years, she made several appearances on German television, while gaining experience in music with her own bands and first professional song recordings. After her high school graduation, Petruo applied herself to her communication studies but quickly chose to leave university in favor of internships at both MTV Germany and news channel N24. She began her professional music career in 1998, forming indie pop duo STiLL with songwriter Bernd Klanke. They released an extended play, STiLL, independently, as they failed to sign a record contract.

== Career ==
=== 2000–2003: Popstars and No Angels ===
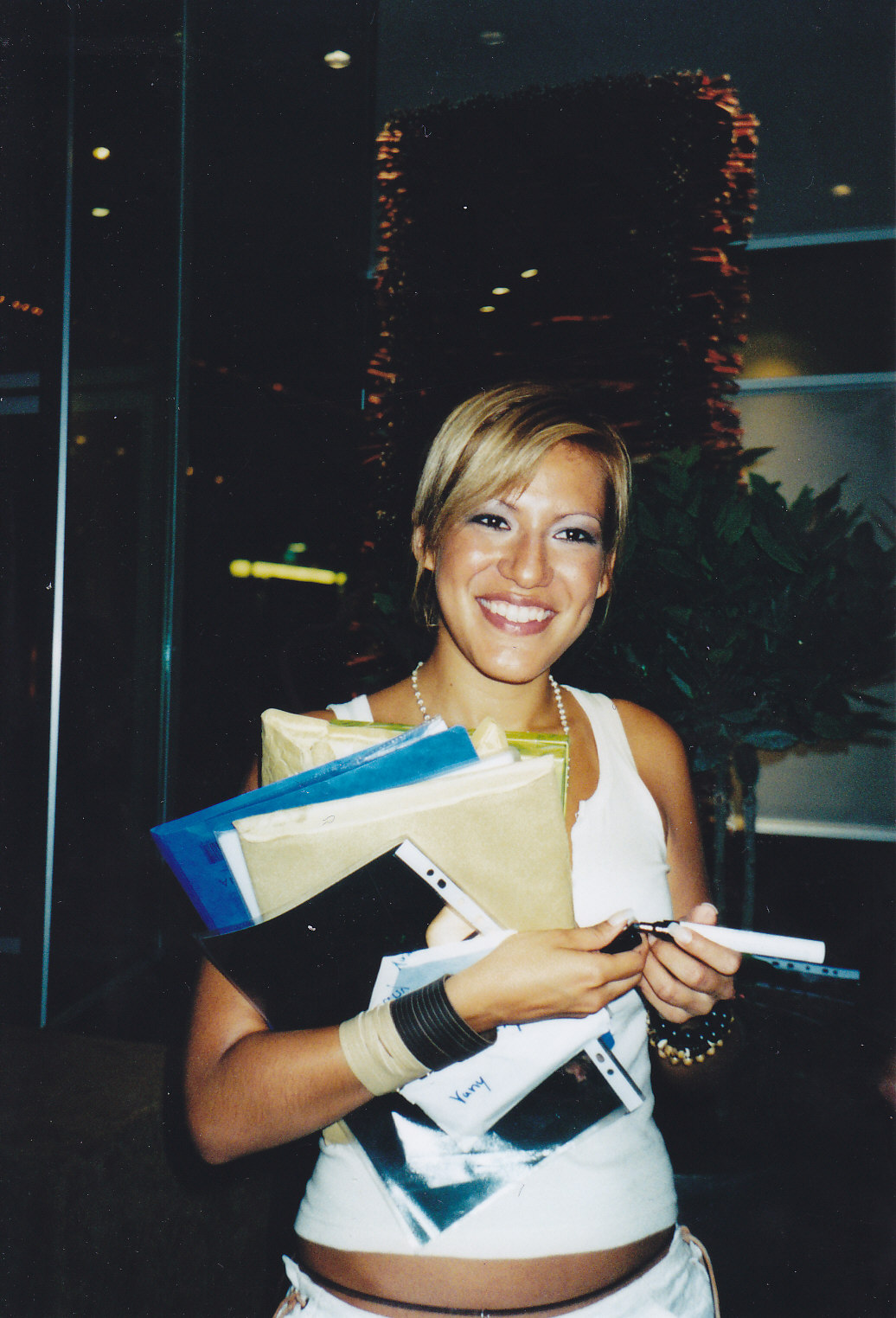
Petruo in 2002

In 2000, Petruo auditioned for German reality television program Popstars. She entered the competition with thousands of other women, and the judges Simone Angel, Rainer Moslener and Mario M. Mendrzycki were impressed with her performance of Bill Withers' hit single "Ain't No Sunshine". She earned a position in the top 30 finalists and travelled to Mallorca, Spain, to join her competitors for a workshop there. In the end Petruo made it to the final ten on the show, and during a special episode in November 2000, jury member Moslener disclosed that Petruo was chosen to become part of the final girl group, later called No Angels, along with Nadja Benaissa, Lucy Diakovska, Sandy Mölling and Jessica Wahls. The five signed a record contract with Polydor Records.

No Angels released their debut single "Daylight in Your Eyes" on 5 February 2001. The song topped the Austrian, German and Swiss Singles Charts, making it one of the most successful debuts of the year. The album Elle'ments mirrored the success of "Daylight in Your Eyes", selling one million units and earning triple platinum and septuplicate gold certifications. The second album Now... Us! followed the success of Elle'ments, and included the single "Something About Us", written by Petruo. Incorporating autobiographical features, it was inspired by Petruo's experiences with the media the year before. "I recalled the past year, the good and the bad times, and I built my own personal resume", she stated.

In the following years, the band released four more albums, including the number 1 charting studio albums Now... Us! and Pure, a live album and a successful swing album title When the Angels Swing.

Altogether the albums spawned twelve singles, including four number 1 singles and ten top 10 hits, making No Angels the most successful European girl group of their era with more than 5 million singles and albums sold.

On 5 September 2003, the group announced that they would no longer be performing together after three years of continual touring and increasing cases of illness. The release of The Best of No Angels in November of the same year marked the end of the band, whose members each went their separate ways. While some decided to go for motherhood or musical and television careers, Petruo planned to take a longer vacation.

No Angels announced a reunion on 31 January 2007, however Petruo declined to join the other four due to focusing on her solo career.

=== 2003–2009: Solo career ===
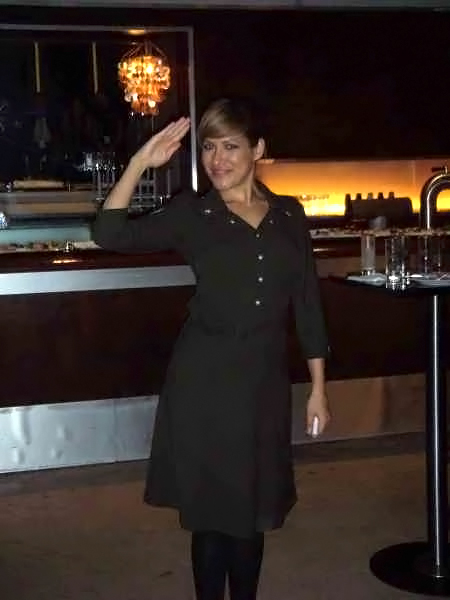
Petruo in 2008

Petruo became the first member of No Angels to launch a career as a solo artist. In April 2004, she released her first single "Drama Queen", co-written along with No Angels collaborators Thorsten Brötzmann and Alexander Geringas, under her nickname Vany. A moderate commercial success, the uptempo song peaked at number eleven on the German Singles Chart. While a video for a second single called "Pop That Melody", produced by Mousse T, was filmed, its release was soon cancelled. Instead, Petruo worked as a simple employee for her record company Cheyenne Records for a couple of months. Following the extension of her recording contract with Polydor and Popstars imprint Cheyenne Records, she signed with Universal Island and her second single "Hot Blooded Woman", followed up by her critically acclaimed but minor successful first solo album Mama Lilla Would in November 2005.

Petruo also spent time on dubbing movies (including Lilo & Stitch and Back to Gaya) and acting, most noticeably as a member of the main cast of Wilde Engel, a TV action series influenced by Charlie's Angels whose four episodes were broadcast in April 2005. In fall 2006, she starred alongside Til Schweiger and Alexandra Maria Lara in the film Where Is Fred?. Still in 2006, Petruo went also on tour with famous soul singer Solounge.

In August 2007, Petruo announced that she had left Universal Island due to varying viewpoints in music and marketing. At the 2009 Echo Awards, Petruo stated that her new album was scheduled for an August 2009 release, but stated in March 2010 that she wanted to wait before releasing an album, avoiding bad media reviews caused by No Angels the previous year (especially Nadja Benaissa's case). She said that she was wishing the girls all the best but that they did not remain friends.

In March 2010, Petruo posted a new demo from her forthcoming album, Happy, on her Facebook page and YouTube account—a new song aimed "for those who are in love". She thanked her fans for their patience, stating again that the album would be released very soon.

Further musical projects failed to materialize, and in 2010, Petruo retired from the recording business in favor of an academic career.

== Discography ==
=== Studio albums ===
Title	Album details	Peak positions		
Title	Album details	GER	AUT	SWI
Mama Lilla Would	Released: 25 November 2005; Label: Universal Island; Formats: CD, digital download	—	—	—

=== Singles ===
Title	Year	Peak positions			Album
Title	Year	GER	AUT	SWI	Album
"Drama Queen"	2004	11	35	88	Non-album single
"Hot Blooded Woman"	2005	59	—	—	Mama Lilla Would
"Break My Wings"	2005				Mama Lilla Would
"—" denotes a recording that did not chart or was not released in that territory.

== Filmography ==
Film
Title	Year	Role	Notes
Pet Sematary	1989	Ellie Creed	(Voice) Dubbed German version
Good Times, Bad Times	1998	Unknown	(TV) Gute Zeiten, schlechte Zeiten
Behind Bars – The Women's Prison	2002	Astrid	(TV) Hinter Gittern – Der Frauenknast
The Little Polar Bear	2001	Manili	(Voice) Der kleine Eisbär
Dr. Dolittle 2	2001	Ava / Girl Bear	(Voice) Dubbed German version
Lilo & Stitch	2002	Nani	(Voice) Dubbed German version
SOKO 5113	2003	Mariza	(TV)
Boo, Zino & the Snurks	2004	Alanta	(Voice) Back to Gaya
3 Wild Angels	2005	Rebecca	(TV) Wilde Engel
Where Is Fred?	2005	Julia	Wo ist Fred?
