= Jessica Wahls =

German singer

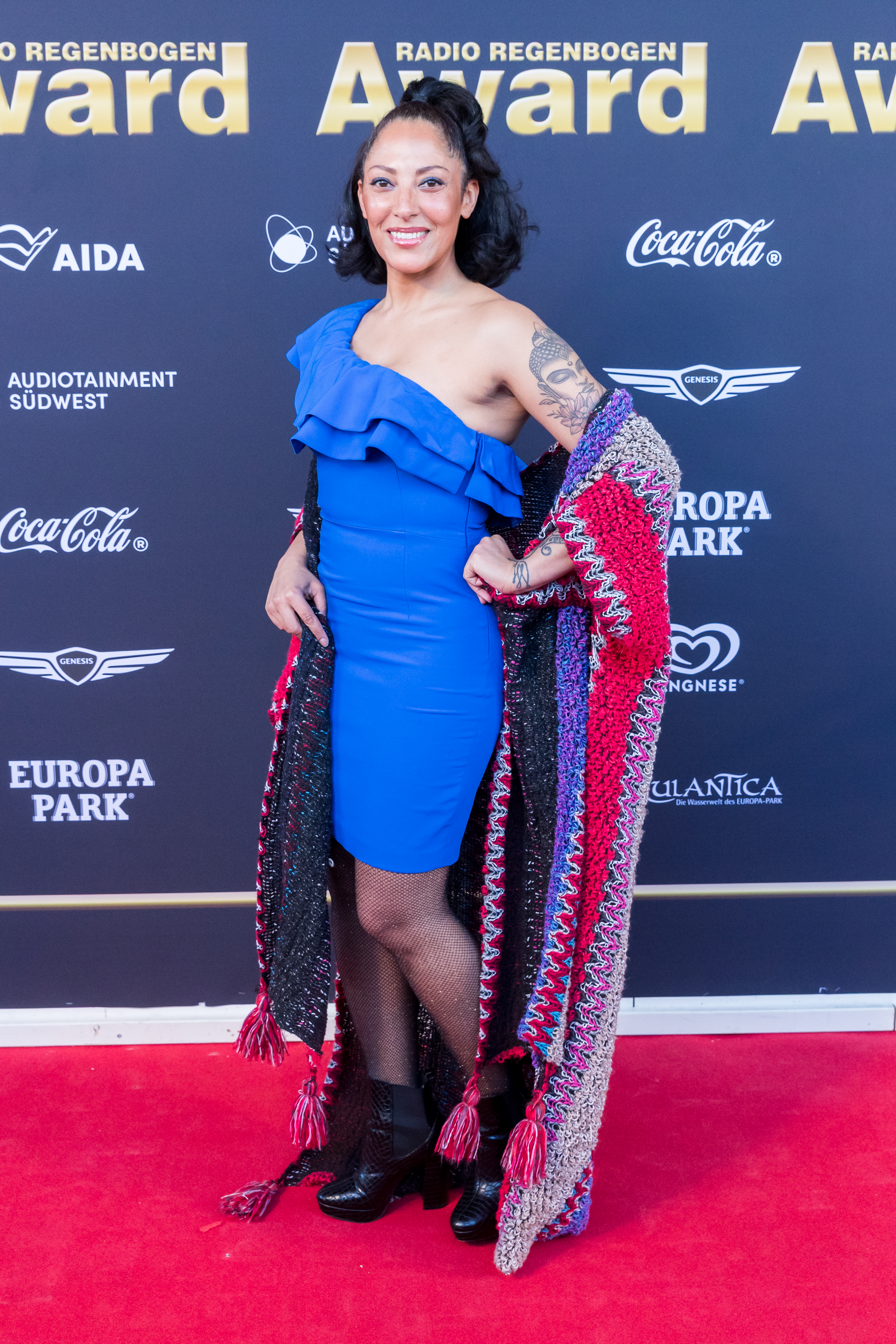
- Wahls at the 2025 Radio Regenbogen Award in Rust.
- Born: Jessica Martina Wahls; 2 February 1977 (age 49); Bad Nauheim, West Germany
- Occupations: Singer, TV host
- Years active: 2000–present
- Children: 1

Jessica Martina Wahls (born 2 February 1977), also known under her nickname Jess, is a German pop singer, radio music editor, and former television host, who rose to fame as one of the founding members of the successful all-female pop band No Angels, the "biggest-selling German girl band to date", according to the German media.

== Biography ==
=== Early life ===
Wahls, the only child born to an African-American father, James, and a German mother, Gabriele, was born in Frankfurt am Main and raised in Rosbach vor der Höhe. Her parents separated when she was six months old, after which she was raised primarily by her mother, who worked as a personal assistant to support the family. Wahls had little contact with her father following the separation. In 1999, Gabriele married Wahls' Barbadian stepfather, Tosh.

Interest in music at an early age, at the age of ten, Wahls was recruited by her aunt, who worked for a record company, for the studio project Mini Stars, with which she performed for three years and appeared on television.At school, she performed in musical productions and was active in the school choir and a music school. She later sang rock and blues songs in a garage band and briefly took singing lessons at the age of 17. After completing her Realschulabschluss in 1995, Wahls obtained her Fachabitur and trained as a travel management assistant in Bad Homburg vor der Höhe. She subsequently moved into an apartment in Bad Nauheim with her boyfriend and later shared the apartment with her friend.

=== 2000–2002: Breakthrough with No Angels ===
In 2000, Jessica broke off her training as a travel management assistant to join the girl group No Angels, the result of a German version of the international television show Popstars. Two successful years later, Jess became pregnant by boyfriend, choreographer and background dancer Sascha Dickreuter, and consequently she had to leave the band for her baby girl by the name of Cheyenne Jessica.

=== 2003–2006: Solo career launch ===
Following her departure from No Angels, Wahls remained with the Cheyenne label through which she launched a solo career in mid-2003. In September 2003, "Ten Steps Back", a dance pop track co-written by Kandi Burruss, was released as her solo debut single. Overshadowed by the announcement that the remaining No Angels quartet would disband in fall 2003, the song debuted and peaked at number 41 on the German Singles Chart only, also reaching the top sixty in Austria. In November, Wahls along with Dickreuter appeared in four episodes of the second season of Stardance on the German KiKa channel in which they taught Dickreuter's choreography from the "Ten Steps Back" music video. The same month, she joined the supergroup TV Allstars for the recording of a cover version of the 1984 Band Aid song "Do They Know It's Christmas?". It reached number three in Germany and was later certified going gold by the BVMI. Wahls also recorded a solo version of the holiday classic "Winter Wonderland" which was included on the supergroup's Christmas compilation album The Ultimate Christmas Album.

Also in November 2003, Wahls re-joined No Angels on a couple of selected dates surrounding the promotion of their farewell compilation album The Best of No Angels and its lead single "Reason", on which she was credited as part of the band again. Wahls also appeared as a special surprise guest at the group's last 2003 concert at the Olympiahalle in Munich. Her second solo single, "Don't Get Me Started", was released in August 2004. The summerly mid-tempo track peaked at number 51 on the German Singles Chart and would remain her final release with Cheyenne Records after the termination of her contract in late-2004. Her solo album, for which she had recorded several tracks since 2003, including "Crime" and "No More", was eventually shelved by Cheyenne. The same year, Wahls lent her vocals to the track "When We Kiss" from German duo Marshall & Alexander's album Lovers Forever (2004).

In March 2005, Wahls made her German language debut with the release of her third single "Du bist wie ich", her debut with Polydor. Serving as the theme song for the KiKa live show KiKA LIVE, it reached number 78 in Germany. Another single, the self-penned "Bedinungslos", was released in November 2005 and marked Wahls' debut with Maseco Records. It peaked at number 92 on the German Singles Chart. As with Cheyenne, the release of an album failed to materialize after the label went bankrupt. Wahls later released several songs to her MySpace account.

== Personal life ==
In 2001, Wahls began a relationship with Austrian medical student and former Big Brother contestant Walter Unterweger. The couple later separated. From 2002 to 2007, she was in a relationship with model and dancer Sascha Dickreuter. Their daughter, Cheyenne, was born in March 2003. Shortly after Cheyenne's birth, the family moved into a single-family home in Rosbach vor der Höhe. Following her separation from Dickreuter, Wahls was briefly in a relationship with Wrangler representative Matthias Funk. In 2012, she moved to Leipzig with her daughter due to her work for Mitteldeutscher Rundfunk. In the autumn of 2025, she completed training as a yoga instructor.

== Discography ==
=== Singles ===
As lead artist

List of singles, with selected chart positions and certifications
Title	Year	Peak chart positions			Album
Title	Year	GER	AUT	SWI	Album
"Ten Steps Back"	2003	41	54	—	Non-album singles
"Don't Get Me Started"	2004	51	—	—	Non-album singles
"Du bist wie ich"	2005	78	—	—	Non-album singles
"Bedingungslos"	2005	92	—	—	Non-album singles

As featured artist

Title	Year	Peak chart positions			Album
Title	Year	GER	AUT	SWI	Album
"Do They Know It's Christmas?" (with TV All Stars)	2003	3	28	32	Ultimate Christmas Album
