= When the Angels Swing =

Live album by No Angels
- Released: 29 November 2002
- Length: 49:34
- Labels: Cheyenne; Polydor
- Producers: Jens Kuphal; Till Brönner

No Angels chronology
Now... Us! (2002)	When the Angels Swing (2002)	Pure (2003)

Singles from When the Angels Swing
- 1. "All Cried Out" Released: 2 December 2002

When the Angels Swing is a live album by German girl group No Angels. It was released by Cheyenne Records and Polydor on 29 November 2002 and recorded in promotion of a special one-off big band concert at the Berlin Tränenpalast on 2 October 2002. Musicians Jens Kuphal and Till Brönner were consulted to re-arrange songs from the group's first two albums Elle'ments (2001) and Now... Us! (2002) for the album which was inspired by the New York City Stork Club and several 1940s swing standards.

The album earned mixed to positive reviews from music critics who noted that it differed highly from the group's previous, mainstream pop releases. While the album failed to chart on the Swiss Albums Chart, When the Angels Swing peaked at number 9 on the German Albums Chart and reached number 22 in Austria. In promotion of the album, "All Cried out," a cover of the same-titled 1984 song by English singer Alison Moyet was issued as a single and became a top 20 success in Germany.

== Background ==
In June 2002, No Angels released their second album, Now... Us!, which featured writing credits by all band members and received critical acclaim from many critics who had thought that the band would not last past their first album Elle'ments (2001). The album debuted at number one on the German Albums Chart and was eventually certified both platinum and double gold by the International Federation of the Phonographic Industry (IFPI). Its leading single "Something About Us", a musical response to what the band felt was intense and sometimes unfair and inaccurate media criticism at the time—predominantly resulting from their casting band image—became the group's third non-consecutive number-one hit in Austria and Germany. Still during the recording of Now... Us! in spring 2002, the girls thought about taking another musical direction and how their songs would sound with a different musical approach. Inspired by Robbie Williams's cover album Swing When You're Winning (2002), in September 2002, the group took a few weeks off to prepare for a special swing concert at the Berlin Tränenpalast.

== Critical reception ==
Professional ratings
Review scores
Source	Rating
laut.de	2/5 stars

Critical reception to When the Angels Swing was generally favorable, though reviewers differed on how well the group's pop material translated to a swing setting. Sachar Kriwoj of Brainstorms! called it a "great album," praising the reworked arrangements and describing "Still in Love with You" as more "intense and emotional" than the original. He considered "There Must Be an Angel" superior to the Eurythmics' version and said "Like Ice in the Sunshine" finally sounded "really good." Although he found "Daylight in Your Eyes" somewhat forced, he considered the album a "must" for No Angels fans and evidence of the group's musical talent. ProSieben.de similarly praised the album for giving the group's earlier hits a "completely new" sound through big-band arrangements and for combining jazz, blues, and swing with their established style. It described the intensified Latin elements of "Still in Love with You" as an "incredible listening experience," praised the group's "vocal power," and concluded that their new direction was "certainly not a wrong decision."

Kronen Zeitung offered a mixed but largely favorable assessment, describing the album as providing "little innovation, but great entertainment value." It praised the group for reworking their own songs rather than relying on standards by artists such as Frank Sinatra, noting that "Daylight in Your Eyes" and "Something About Us" gained a new feel through their swing and big-band arrangements. The newspaper called the album "certainly indispensable" for No Angels fans and recommended it even to listeners who had previously been uninterested in the group. By contrast, Dorothee von Peterffy of Laut.de gave the album a more critical assessment. She praised the "successful" arrangement of "Still in Love with You," the suitability of the swing style to "Something About Us," and the contribution of the big band on "Funky Dance," but considered "Like Ice in the Sunshine" and "Rivers of Joy" poorly suited to the concept, arguing that "jazz is completely out of place" on those tracks. Comparing the album unfavorably with Robbie Williams' swing recordings, she concluded that the No Angels' contemporary pop songs did not "want to fit" the swing style and were unlikely to achieve comparable success.

== Chart performance ==
Released on 29 November 2002, When the Angels Swing debuted at number 89 on the German Albums Chart in the week of 9 December 2002. The following week, it jumped to – and peaked at – number nine on the chart, becoming the band's third consecutive top ten album. The album would spend 14 weeks on the German Albums Chart. In Austria, When the Angels Swing debuted and peaked at number 22 on the Austrian Albums Chart in the week of 15 December 2002. It remained ten weeks inside the top 75.

== Track listing ==
When the Angels Swing track listing
No.	Title	Writer(s)	Producer(s)	Length
1.	"Daylight in Your Eyes"	Tony Bruno; Tommy Byrnes	Till Brönner; Jens Kuphal	3:34
2.	"Autumn Breeze"	Dennis Dowlut	Brönner; Kuphal	3:52
3.	"Funky Dance"	Thomas Anders; Christian Geller; Lucy Diakovska	Brönner; Kuphal	3:02
4.	"Ice in the Sunshine"	Holger Julian Copp; Hanno Harders	Brönner; Kuphal	2:44
5.	"There Must Be an Angel"	Annie Lennox; David A. Stewart	Brönner; Kuphal	3:56
6.	"Faith Can Move a Mountain"	Julian Feifel	Brönner; Kuphal	3:31
7.	"2 Get Over You"	Sandi Schumann; Tim Brettschneider; Alan Glass	Brönner; Kuphal	3:23
8.	"Still in Love with You"	Figge Boström; Johan Lindman	Brönner; Kuphal	3:38
9.	"Now That We Found Love"	Ulrich Wehner; Thorsten Brötzmann	Brönner; Kuphal	3:50
10.	"Something About Us"	Vanessa Petruo; Brötzmann; Alexander Geringas	Brönner; Kuphal	3:47
11.	"That's the Reason"	Brötzmann; Geringas	Brönner; Kuphal	3:27
12.	"Anchor Your Love"	Oliver Dommaschk; Marco Quast; Kaidy-Ann Morgan	Brönner; Kuphal	3:28
13.	"Rivers of Joy"	Niklas Pettersson; Hans Andersson	Brönner; Kuphal	3:26
Total length:				43:19

Bonus track
No.	Title	Writer(s)	Producer(s)	Length
14.	"All Cried Out"	Alison Moyet; Steve Jolley; Tony Swain	Perky Park	3:53
Total length:				43:19

== Credits and personnel ==
- Achim Hartmann – bass trombone
- Alexander Feucht – violin
- Andrea Thoma – violin
- Axel Schlosser – trumpet
- Charles Franck – piano
- Christian Diener – acoustic bass, electric bass
- Dan Collette – trumpet
- Dirk Decker – vocal recording
- Edgar Herzog – baritone saxophone
- Grégoire Peters – tenor saxophone
- Günter Bollmann – trombone
- Hendrik Soll – keyboards
- Jan Larsen – viola
- Jens Kuphal – producer
- Joe Giorgianni – trumpet
- Jörg A. Keller – arranger, conductor
- Jürgen Grimm – grand piano
- Kai Brückner – guitar
- Karl Schloz – guitar
- Lucas Von Cranach – assistant production manager
- Mark Wyand – alto saxophone
- Martin von der Nahmer – viola
- Meta Hüper – violin
- Miriam Müller – violin
- Nik Hafemann – executive producer, vocal arranger
- No Angels – vocal arranger
- Norbert Nagel – alto saxophone
- Olga Holdorff – violin
- Peter Tiehuis – guitar
- Pino Brönner – production manager
- Regina Weber – management
- Roland Peil – percussion
- Rüdiger Baldauf – trumpet
- Sebastian Fischer – cello
- Sibylle Strobel – violin
- Stefan Heinemeyer – cello
- Thomas Loup – trombone
- Till Brönner – arranger, music director, producer
- Tobias Lehmann – recording angineer
- Torsten Maaß – arranger
- Uli Plettendorff – trombone
- Walter Gauchel – tenor saxophone
- Wolf Kerschek – arranger
- Wolfgang Haffner – drums

== Charts ==
Chart performance for When the Angels Swing
Chart (2002)	Peak position
Austrian Albums (Ö3 Austria)	22
European Top 100 Albums (Billboard)	50
German Albums (Offizielle Top 100)	9

== Certifications ==
Certifications for When the Angels Swing
Region	Certification	Certified units/sales
Germany (BVMI) DVD certification	Gold	25,000^{^}
^{^} Shipments figures based on certification alone.
