= Celebration Tour (No Angels) =

2022 concert tour by No Angels

- Tour by No Angels
- Promotional poster for the tour
- Location: Germany
- Associated album: 20
- Start date: 18 June 2022
- End date: 8 October 2022
- No. of shows: 10 (3 cancelled)
- Supporting acts: Jazzy Gudd; Antje Schomaker

No Angels concert chronology
- An Intimate Evening with... No Angels (2010); Celebration Tour (2022); Still in Love with You – Summer 2025 (2025)

The Celebration Tour is the fourth concert tour by German pop band No Angels. Launched in support of their sixth studio album, 20 (2021), it was originally announced as a special one-off event named Celebration Live to coincide with the twentieth release anniversary of their debut album Elle'ments (2001). Following strong first day ticket sales, the open-air concert was incorporated in a full-length concert tour. The band's first tour in twelve years, it began on 18 June 2022 in Berlin at the Parkbühne Wuhlheide. Following a longer break, it continued on 23 September and concluded on 8 October 2022.

== Background ==
After reuniting as a quartet in 2007 and releasing two albums, No Angels went their separate ways starting in 2010. In late 2020, BMG Rights Management acquired the music catalog of group's former label, Cheyenne Records. On 27 November 2020, following a five-year absence from digital streaming platforms, the group’s back catalogue from 2000 to 2004 was re-released online. This reissue was accompanied by a digital campaign and the release of remastered, high-quality versions of their original music videos. The strong streaming performance and renewed interest from both media outlets and longtime fans prompted former band members Nadja Benaissa, Lucy Diakovska, Sandy Mölling, and Jessica Wahls to launch an official Instagram account, through which they shared personal photographs and hosted several livestreams in the weeks that followed.

Encouraged by BMG's interest in updating their early discography, the quartet officially reunited in January 2021 to record new vocals for a reimagined "Celebration Version" of their 2001 hit "Daylight in Your Eyes," working alongside producer and manager Christian Geller. Released on 12 February 2021 to mark the song’s 20th anniversary, the single reached the top ten of the German Download Chart. Following their first live performance in over a decade in February 2021, the group signed a new recording contract with BMG and commenced work on 20, their first full-length studio album since 2009. Released on 4 June 2021 as part of their anniversary celebrations, the album, featuring four original tracks alongside sixteen updated versions of songs from their first three studio albums, debuted at number one on the German Albums Chart, propelling the band back to the top of the charts nearly two decades after their initial success.

== Critical reception ==
From left: Diakovska, Benaissa, Mölling, and Wahls at their 30 September 2022 concert in Nürnberg.

Neue Westfälische editor Heimo Stefula praised the show, writing, "The quartet burned off a firework of hits in just under two hours, which was well received by the audience from the first second." Hessenschau critic Anne Heigel echoed his statements. She wrote: "In Frankfurt, there was deafening applause, beaming faces and pure nostalgia." Heigel noted that the band performed without "any complex stage sets" but instead offered "joint dance choreographies" and some "well-known classics."

Christof Hammer from Stuttgarter Nachrichten was ambivalent about the "fairly conventionally staged program," some "unstable" vocal performances and the "rather dull" sound inside the Liederhalle, but concluded: "Much more [...] counts on this evening: The emotions between a band and its fans, the memories of the carefree youth of the 2000s and the warm feeling of still being there twenty years later and reuniting. Every song, every word from the stage becomes real soul food, the whole concert is almost a happening [...] Seen from this angle: An evening perfectly suited to times like these."

== Release ==
With much of their opening concert at the Parkbühne Wuhlheide tracked by a film crew, on 27 January 2023, the band began releasing videos of their performances that night on their YouTube account.

== Set list ==
This set list is representative of the 18 June 2022 show in Berlin.

1. "Daylight in Your Eyes"
2. "All Cried Out"
3. "Down Boy"
4. "Three Words"
5. "Send Me Flowers"
6. "Someday"
7. "Goodbye to Yesterday"
8. "A New Day"
9. "A Reason"
10. "Washes Over Me"
11. "Too Old"
12. "When the Angels Sing"
13. "Still in Love with You"
14. "No Angel (It's All in Your Mind)"
15. "Mad Wild"
16. "Maybe"
17. "Back Off"
18. "Feelgood Lies"
19. "One Life"
20. "Let's Go to Bed" (contains elements of "You Could Be the First")
21. "Disappear"
22. "Something About Us"
23. "There Must Be an Angel"

Encore

24. "We Keep the Spirit Alive"
25. "That's the Reason"
26. "Rivers of Joy" (contains elements of "We Found Love")

Notes

- "Down Boy", "Washes Over Me", "Too Old", "Maybe", "Back Off", and "That's the Reason" were omitted from subsequent concerts.

== Tour dates ==
List of concerts
| Date | City | Country | Venue | Attendance |
|---|---|---|---|---|
| 18 June 2022 | Berlin | Germany | Parkbühne Wuhlheide | 12,500 |
| 23 September 2022 | Stuttgart | Germany | Liederhalle Beethovensaal | 1,600 |
| 24 September 2022 | Hannover | Germany | Swiss Life Hall | 1,800 |
| 25 September 2022 | Hamburg | Germany | Barclays Arena | 2,500 |
| 27 September 2022 | Leipzig | Germany | Haus Auensee | Unknown |
| 30 September 2022 | Nürnberg | Germany | Meistersingerhalle | 1,400 |
| 2 October 2022 | Munich | Germany | Dampfdom | 1,200 |
| 5 October 2022 | Frankfurt am Main | Germany | Batschkapp | Unknown |
| 6 October 2022 | Bielefeld | Germany | Stadthalle | 900 |
| 8 October 2022 | Cologne | Germany | Palladium | 4,000 |

== Cancelled shows ==
On 5 September 2022, the band announced on Instagram that the planned concerts in Erfurt, Rostock and Zürich would be cancelled, citing increasing productions costs as a reason.

List of cancelled concerts
| Date | City | Country | Venue |
|---|---|---|---|
| 29 September 2022 | Rostock | Germany | Stadthalle |
| 1 October 2022 | Erfurt | Germany | Messehalle |
| 4 October 2022 | Zürich | Switzerland | Halle 622 |
