= 20 (No Angels album) =

Studio album by No Angels
- Released: 4 June 2021
- Length: 72:36
- Label: BMG
- Producer: Christian Geller

No Angels chronology
Welcome to the Dance (2009)	20 (2021)	It's Christmas (2025)

Singles from 20
- 1. "Daylight in Your Eyes" Released: 12 February 2021; 2. "Still in Love with You" Released: 4 June 2021; 3. "Mad Wild" Released: 6 August 2021; 4. "When the Angels Sing" Released: 26 November 2021

20 is the sixth studio album by all-female German pop group No Angels. It was released by BMG Rights Management on 4 June 2021 in German-speaking Europe to coincide with the twentieth release anniversary of their debut single "Daylight in Your Eyes" (2001). The band's first full-length release since Welcome to the Dance (2009), 20 consists of twenty tracks, featuring four original songs and sixteen updated versions of songs that were selected from their first three studio albums Elle'ments (2001), Now... Us! (2002) and Pure (2003). Produced by Christian Geller, it marked the band's third full-length release to feature No Angels' third lineup, excluding original band member Vanessa Petruo.

The album received mixed reviews from critics, some of whom complimented the more cohesive, mature production as well as the modern nature of the new material, while others questioned the overall value of the project. 20 debuted at number one on the German Albums Chart, becoming No Angels' fourth non-consecutive number-one album as well as their first chart topper in nearly two decades, and reached the top ten in Austria and Switzerland. Its release was preceded by the re-recorded singles "Daylight in Your Eyes" and "Still in Love with You", both of which were accompanied by two new music videos. In support of the 20, No Angels also embarked on their fourth concert tour, the Celebration Tour, in 2022.

== Background ==
In September 2010, following the release of the band's fifth studio album Welcome to the Dance (2009) and her two-year suspended sentence a month before, original band member Nadja Benaissa announced her departure from No Angels, leaving the band as a trio. While Lucy Diakovska, Sandy Mölling, and Jessica Wahls were said to release a live album in 2011, this project and other plans announced for the tenth anniversary of the band failed to materialize. With Benaissa leaving a void within the group, the remaining three members of the band decided not to accept any further booking requests and instead reaffirmed their focus on individual solo projects and private ambitions. In 2014, Diakovska confirmed that the band had dissolved again with no new commercial projects planned.

In the following years, the former band members reconnected in private. On 27 November 2020, the complete catalogue of No Angels albums re-entered various streaming platforms after BMG Rights Management had acquired the rights from Cheyenne Records. The mostly positive reception of the re-release made the band members develop an Instagram account presenting both professional as well as amateur photos dating back to their early stages as a group. Rumors regarding a possible comeback in 2021 sparked shortly after, and while the band had initially planned to record a split screen video with all of them singing along the original backing track of "Daylight in Your Eyes" to celebration the song's 20th anniversary, Wahls, Mölling, Benaissa and Diakovska were soon asked to sign a new deal with BMG to re-record the song, followed by a full-length album. Original band member Vanessa Petruo, who had previously announced her retirement from the public eye, was not asked whether she would take part again.

== Recording ==
Recording of 20 started with the celebration version of No Angels' 2001 debut single "Daylight in Your Eyes" for which all vocals were recorded separately in January 2021 due to travel restrictions because of the COVID-19 pandemic. While Nadja Benaissa and Jessica Wahls recorded their vocals at producer Christian Geller's studio in Andernach, Lucy Diakovska went into a nearby studio in Bulgaria. Sandy Mölling used the Los Angeles home studio of her husband Nasri Atweh to work with Geller on the song. Additional recording began in Andernach in the first week of March 2021 where Mölling cut several tracks before returning to the United States. On 8 March 2021, Wahls took to Instagram to reveal that she had started work with Geller on a new version of "There Must Be an Angel." During an Instagram live stream, Mölling hinted on the absence of new renditions of material from the albums Destiny (2007) and Welcome to the Dance (2009). She explained that the latter album in particular would have been ahead of its time when it was released and would therefore have a more contemporary sound. Furthermore, in contrast to the repertoire from the years 2001 to 2003, the records had already been released with the band's current line-up. Therefore, there would not have been the necessity to re-record the tracks. The master recordings of the whole album were handed in on April 16, 2021, as Geller confirmed via his Instagram the same day.

In addition to sixteen cover versions of their own songs, including two different celebration versions of "Still in Love with You," the band recorded several new tracks for 20. While it was initially announced that five new songs would be included on the album, only four made the track listing after BMG wanted the fifth song to be recorded by a female solo artist. "We Keep the Spirit Alive," co-written by Mölling, is an uptempo power pop and synth-pop song that has been compared with English singer Dua Lipa's "Physical" (2020). The song features several 1980s and disco tropes in its production, making use of a synthwave bassline and a techno beat. Lyrically, "We Keep the Spirit Alive" borrows from several others No Angels songs, with lines such as "awakened by the race of daylight, we cried a river full of joy" often incorporating former song titles. Mölling also co-wrote "Love You for Eternity," a power ballad that alternates between calm verses and hymn-like choruses. "A New Day," a "spherical" high-energy pop track that is built upon a clapping drum pattern, was written by Atweh. A song about the hope and trust in better times, it was inspired by the deleterious mental consequences of the COVID-19 pandemic and its associated lockdowns and distancing measures. "Mad Wild," co-written by American-Canadian singer Sophie Simmons and Icelandic singer Ásdís, is the only title that was chosen from a selection of around a dozen songs which their record company BMG had proposed for recording, being the favorite individual choice of every No Angels member. A song about a toxic relationship that repeatedly culminates in physical intimacy rather than being conclusively ended for the sake of personal well-being, it is built upon a bouncing synth bass and a 1980s-style snare sample, blending elements of funk and pop with contemporary R&B sounds. Benaissa described "Mad Wild" as a "modern, powerful [...] feel good track."

== Promotion ==
=== Singles ===
"Daylight in Your Eyes" was released as the lead single from 20 on 12 February 2021. It debuted and peaked at number six on the German Download Chart, also prompting the original version to re-enter the German Singles Chart at number 74. On 22 April 2021, it was announced that "There Must Be an Angel (celebration version)" would be made available on streaming and downloading platforms the next day, serving as a teaser single. Another teaser single, the celebration version of "Rivers of Joy," was released on 14 May 2021. Both songs were accompanied by lyric videos that were released on YouTube. On 21 May 2021, the band filmed a music video for "Still in Love with You" at the Mediterana day spa in Bergisch Gladbach. The song was made available on 4 June 2021 and served as the second single from 20. The video for "Still in Love with You" premiered on the pre-taped music show Schlagercountdown – So wird's bald wieder sein, broadcast on Das Erste on 5 June 2021, while the song peaked at number 34 on the German Download Chart in the following week. A third single, a previously unreleased version of "Mad Wild," was issued on 6 August 2021 and reached number 67 on the same chart. In an interview with Antenne Radio, released on 25 June 2021, Diakovska revealed that the band would film a video for a further single, most likely "A New Day," to be taken from 20 in October 2021. However, these plans were later cancelled. On 26 November 2021, No Angels released a winter edition of "When the Angels Sing," a Christmas-themed remix of the song's 2021 celebration version featuring a new instrumentation and a gospel choir. In December 2021, Benaissa confirmed that the group was expecting to release another single from 20 in support of their 2022 Celebration Tour though again this did not come to fruition.

=== Performances ===
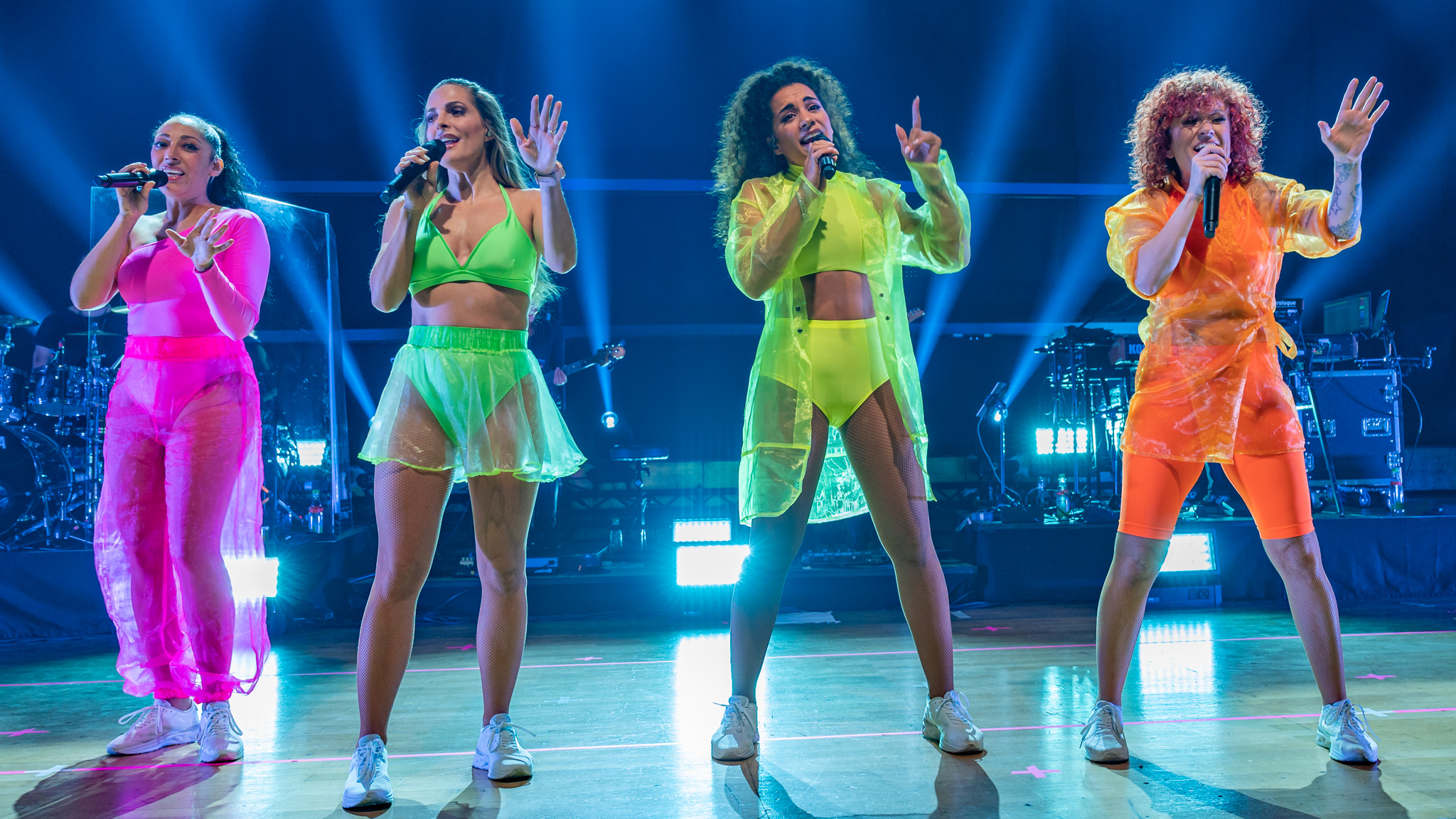
Wahls, Mölling, Benaissa and Diakovska at Meistersingerhalle in September 2022.

On 27 February 2021, the band made their first performance in a decade on the Das Erste music show Schlagerchampions – Das grosse Fest der Besten, hosted by singer Florian Silbereisen, where they performed "Daylight in Your Eyes." Following a short hiatus, the band reunited on 28 May 2021 to perform a medley of the celebration versions of "Daylight in Your Eyes", "Rivers of Joy" and "There Must Be an Angel" at the season finale of the dance competition television series Let's Dance. The performance was largely panned by critics, who criticized the band for singing lip sync. On 4 June 2021, No Angels played a live streaming concert on RTL Deutschland's website rtl.de. A mini-concert consisting of "There Must Be an Angel", "Still in Love with You", "Rivers of Joy", "A New Day" and "Daylight in Your Eyes," the broadcast was interrupted by a storm front across Cologne only minutes after their performance. Two days later, the band performed "Still in Love with You" and "Daylight in Your Eyes" on ZDF-Fernsehgarten, broadcast live from the grounds of the ZDF broadcasting centre at Mainz. On 17 June, No Angels appeared on Die Carolin Kebekus Show where they sung a shortened version of "Still in Love with You" and performed a girl band medley along with host Carolin Kebekus. On 24 July 2021, No Angels appeared on Gottschalks große 90er-Show where they performed a live version of the Spice Girls' "Too Much" (1997). Following another break, the band reteamed in fall 2021 to perform the winter version of "When the Angels Sing" on Das Adventsfest der 100.000 Lichter, broadcast on 27 November.

== Critical reception ==
Professional ratings
Review scores
Source	Rating
CDStarts.de	5/10
laut.de	2/5 stars
mix1.de	7/8
Plattentests	3/10

Matthias Halbig, writing for RedaktionsNetzwerk Deutschland, found that most on 20 is typical No Angels fare "with fresh beats and strong vocal recordings, though a handful of songs suggest that the re-docking with the music scene is future-oriented. These new songs – with the exception of the ballad 'Love You for Eternity' – don't stick out much on the lush 20-song list, which speaks for a coherent production in first place." Aida Baghernejad from daily newspaper Die Tageszeitung remarked that with 20 "the basses are fatter, the voices more mature and full, the composition more sophisticated." She felt that "the new songs almost exclusively rely on a feeling of nostalgia [...] and their sound could just as well be from the rest Oeuvre." News agency Deutsche Presse-Agentur noted that new songs such "as "Mad Wild" or "We Keep the Spirit Alive" are fresh pop numbers that fit perfectly into today's radio landscape. Sometimes funky, sometimes with an 80s sound. It almost seems like No Angels never left."

Magnus-Vinzenz Franz from laut.de found that "the darker and more mature atmosphere" of the re-recordings on 20 "is a nice alternative to the sometimes wild and stormy originals," but they "just offer very little added value." Of the new material, he particularly emphasized "Mad Wild" with its "bouncing synth bass and '80s snare sample" which he compared to Ariana Grande und Dua Lipa. In his review for t-online.de Sebastian Berning wrote that the production on 20 "is more modern, but the songs are largely preserved." He found that while the four new songs "are good pop goods, "Mad Wild" or the somewhat ABBA-like "We Keep the Spirit Alive" can't get out of the shadows of the big hits." Similarly, Matthias Reichel from CDStarts.de wrote that while "the magic has fallen by the wayside [...] the revised arrangements are not remotely entangled in experiments, so even non-fans [can] recognize them immediately." He felt that the "new songs have a hard time, as expected, but they don't distract. In particular "We Keep the Spirit Alive," which incorporates a few harmonies from The Weeknd's "Blinding Lights," can keep up quite well." In a negative review, Süddeutsche Zeitung journalist Jakob Biazza wrote that 20 "sounds as if you had chosen the pre-set 'Deutschdancepop 2000' for the automatic accompaniment of a medium-priced keyboard and would then have died of boredom and shame with your hands clutching the second inversion of a C major chord."

== Chart performance ==
20 debuted at number one on the German Albums Chart in the week of 11 June 2021. It became No Angels' non-consecutive fourth album to reach the top position on the chart as well as their first number one entry since Pure (2003) nearly two decades before. 20 also became the first chart topper in the country by a girl group in fifteen years, following the December 2006 peak of Temptation by fellow Popstars winners Monrose. In Austria, the album debuted at number two on the Austrian Albums Chart, becoming No Angels' third album to do so. As in Germany, this marked their highest peak since Pure. In Switzerland, 20 debuted at number six on the Swiss Albums Chart. The band's fourth top ten album on the chart, it marked their highest-charting album since the top five peak of Now... Us! (2002).

== Track listing ==
All tracks produced by Christian Geller.

20 track listing
No.	Title	Writer(s)	Length
1.	"Daylight in Your Eyes" (celebration version)	Anthony Michael Bruno; Thomas Byrnes; Paul Mahos	3:31
2.	"Still in Love with You" (celebration version)	Figge Boström; Johan Lindman	3:38
3.	"Something About Us" (celebration version)	Vanessa Petruo; Thorsten Brötzmann; Alexander Geringas	3:34
4.	"When the Angels Sing" (celebration version)	Peter Ries; Charlemaine Thomas-Schmidtner	3:46
5.	"Rivers of Joy" (celebration version)	Hans Andersson; Niklas Petterson	3:30
6.	"There Must Be an Angel" (celebration version)	Annie Lennox; David A. Stewart	3:57
7.	"We Keep the Spirit Alive"	Christian Geller; Christoph Assmann; Sandy Mölling	3:26
8.	"All Cried Out" (celebration version)	Steve Jolley; Alison Moyet; Tony Swain	3:32
9.	"Someday" (celebration version)	Niklas Hillbom; Thomas Jansson	3:18
10.	"Mad Wild"	Andrew Tyler; Ásdís María Viðarsdóttir; Flo August; Sophie Alexandra Tweed-Simmons	2:39
11.	"Washes Over Me" (celebration version)	Arlene Gold; Brian Nash; Mike Post	4:12
12.	"Feelgood Lies" (celebration version)	Pelle Ankarberg; Charlie Dore; Niclas Molinder; Maryann Morgan; Joacim Persson	3:34
13.	"A New Day"	Nasri Atweh	3:16
14.	"Faith Can Move a Mountain" (celebration version)	Julian Feifel	3:41
15.	"Cold as Ice" (celebration version)	David Brunner; Christopher Cousins; Marc Klammer	4:12
16.	"Love You for Eternity"	Geller; Assmann; Atweh; Mölling	3:51
17.	"Cry for You" (celebration version)	Thomas Anders; Geller	3:34
18.	"No Angel (It's All in Your Mind)" (celebration version)	Pete Kirtley; Tim Hawes; Liz Winstanley	3:12
19.	"That's the Reason" (celebration version)	Brötzmann; Geringas	3:35
20.	"Still in Love with You" (acoustic celebration version)	Boström; Lindman	3:38
Total length:			1:12:36

== Personnel and credits ==
Credits adapted from the liner notes of 20.

- Christoph Assmann – arranger, instruments
- Nadja Benaissa – vocals
- Lucy Diakovska – vocals
- Christian Geller – arranger, instruments, producer
- Manuel Lopez – guitar
- Anya Mahnken – vocal arranger
- Sandy Mölling – vocals
- Ronald Reinsberg – artwork
- Jessica Wahls – vocals
- Dieter Wegner – mastering
- Ben Wolf – photography

== Charts ==
=== Weekly charts ===
Weekly chart performance for 20
Chart (2021)	Peak position
Austrian Albums (Ö3 Austria)	2
German Albums (Offizielle Top 100)	1
Swiss Albums (Schweizer Hitparade)	6

=== Year-end charts ===
Year-end chart performance for 20
Chart (2021)	Position
German Albums (Offizielle Top 100)	88

== Release history ==
20 release history
Region	Date	Format	Label	Ref(s)
Various	4 June 2021	CD; Digital download; Streaming; Vinyl	BMG	
