= List of number-one hits of 2002 (Germany) =

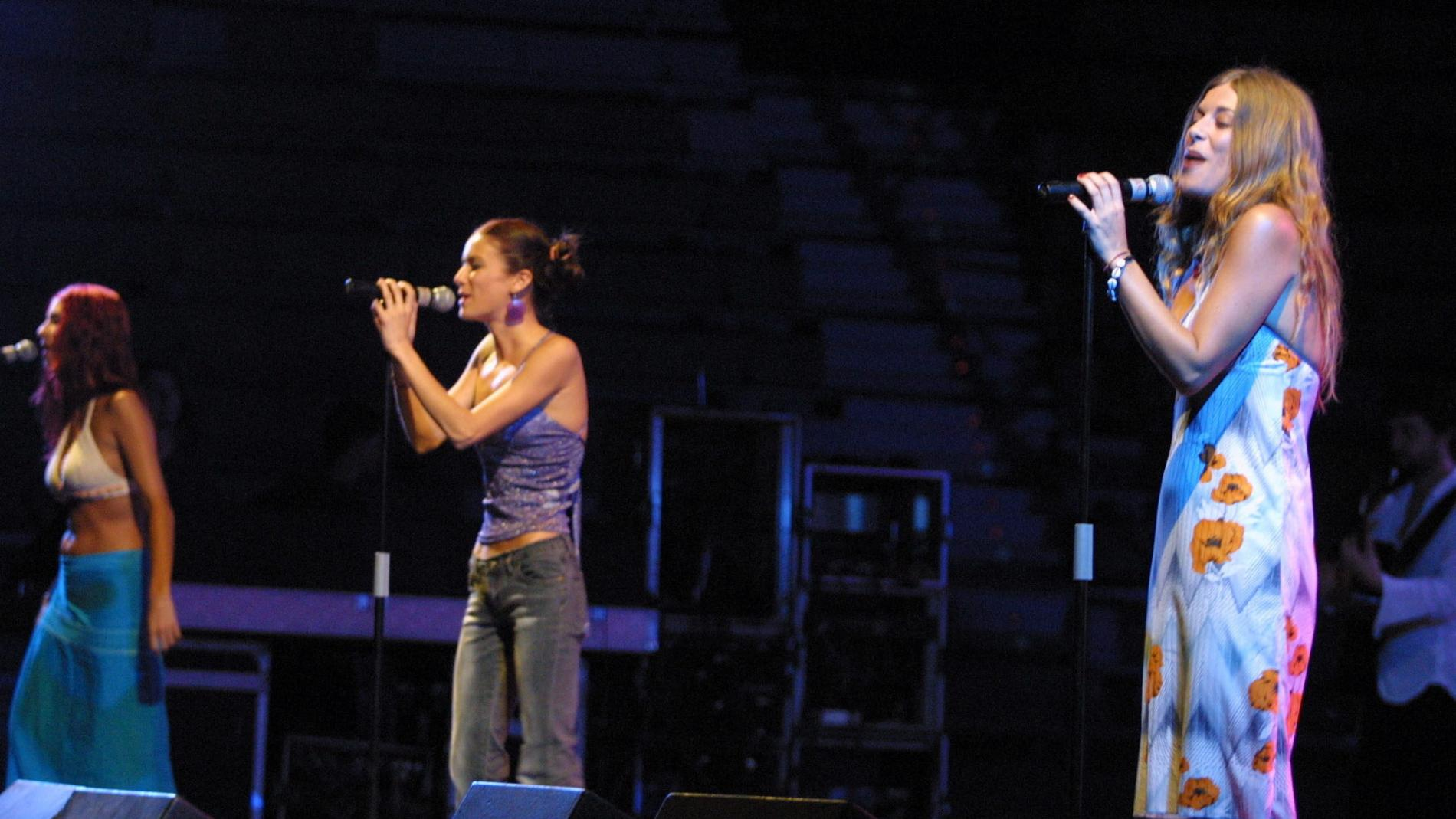
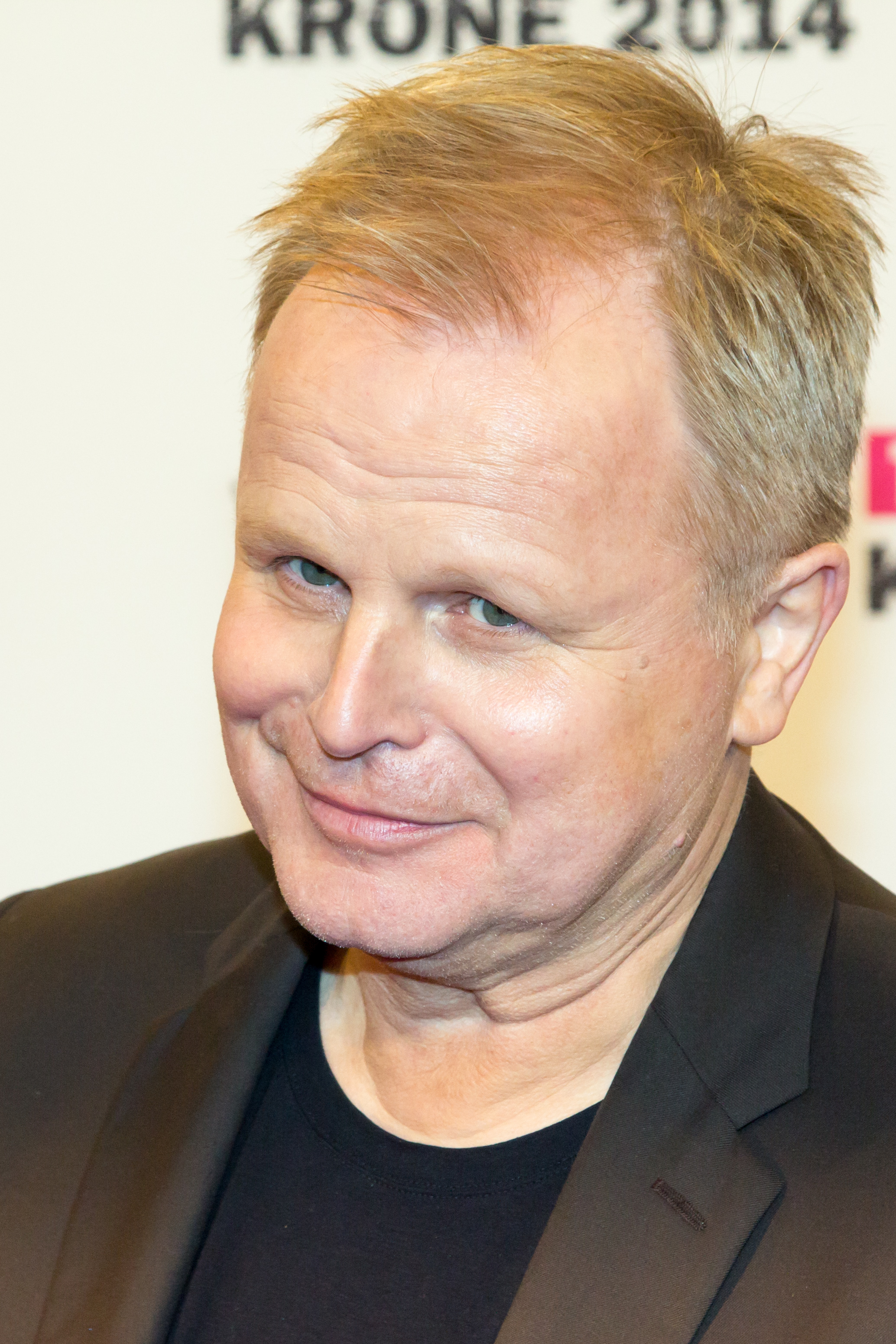
Las Ketchup's "The Ketchup Song (Aserejé)" became the best-performing single of 2002, while Herbert Grönemeyer's "Mensch" became the best-performing album of the year.

This is a list of songs which reached number one on the German Media Control Top100 Singles Chart in 2002.

== Number-one hits by week ==
Key
†	Indicates best-performing single and album of 2002

Issue date	Song	Artist	Ref.	Album	Artist	Ref.
7 January	"I Believe"	Bro'Sis		Swing When You're Winning	Robbie Williams	
14 January	"I Believe"	Bro'Sis		Swing When You're Winning	Robbie Williams	
21 January	"I Believe"	Bro'Sis		Swing When You're Winning	Robbie Williams	
28 January	"May It Be"	Enya		Swing When You're Winning	Robbie Williams	
4 February	"Whenever, Wherever"	Shakira		Auswärtsspiel	Die Toten Hosen	
11 February	"Whenever, Wherever"	Shakira		Never Forget (Where You Come From)	Bro'Sis	
18 February	"Whenever, Wherever"	Shakira		Never Forget (Where You Come From)	Bro'Sis	
25 February	"Whenever, Wherever"	Shakira		Freak of Nature	Anastacia	
4 March	"Whenever, Wherever"	Shakira		Freak of Nature	Anastacia	
11 March	"Whenever, Wherever"	Shakira		Under Rug Swept	Alanis Morissette	
18 March	"Whenever, Wherever"	Shakira		Freak of Nature	Anastacia	
25 March	"Whenever, Wherever"	Shakira		Freak of Nature	Anastacia	
1 April	"Whenever, Wherever"	Shakira		Victory	Modern Talking	
8 April	"Whenever, Wherever"	Shakira		Zwischenspiel – Alles für den Herrn	Xavier Naidoo	
15 April	"Whenever, Wherever"	Shakira		Zwischenspiel – Alles für den Herrn	Xavier Naidoo	
22 April	"Nessaja"	Scooter		Zwischenspiel – Alles für den Herrn	Xavier Naidoo	
29 April	"Like a Prayer"	Mad'House		Dopamin	Böhse Onkelz	
6 May	"Nessaja"	Scooter		Dopamin	Böhse Onkelz	
13 May	"Nessaja"	Scooter		Lifelines	A-ha	
20 May	"Something About Us"	No Angels		Lifelines	A-ha	
27 May	"Something About Us"	No Angels		18	Moby	
3 June	"Something About Us"	No Angels		Destination	Ronan Keating	
10 June	"Something About Us"	No Angels		The Eminem Show	Eminem	
17 June	"Without Me"	Eminem		The Eminem Show	Eminem	
24 June	"Without Me"	Eminem		Untouchables	Korn	
1 July	"Without Me"	Eminem		The Eminem Show	Eminem	
8 July	"Without Me"	Eminem		Now... Us!	No Angels	
15 July	"Without Me"	Eminem		Now... Us!	No Angels	
22 July	"Without Me"	Eminem		By the Way	Red Hot Chili Peppers	
29 July	"Without Me"	Eminem		By the Way	Red Hot Chili Peppers	
5 August	"Without Me"	Eminem		By the Way	Red Hot Chili Peppers	
12 August	"Without Me"	Eminem		The Rising	Bruce Springsteen	
19 August	"Mensch"	Herbert Grönemeyer		The Rising	Bruce Springsteen	
26 August	"Mensch"	Herbert Grönemeyer		The Rising	Bruce Springsteen	
2 September	"Mensch"	Herbert Grönemeyer		The Rising	Bruce Springsteen	
9 September	"Mensch"	Herbert Grönemeyer		A Rush of Blood to the Head	Coldplay	
16 September	"Mensch"	Herbert Grönemeyer		Mensch †	Herbert Grönemeyer	
23 September	"The Ketchup Song (Aserejé)" †	Las Ketchup		Mensch †	Herbert Grönemeyer	
30 September	"The Ketchup Song (Aserejé)" †	Las Ketchup		Mensch †	Herbert Grönemeyer	
7 October	"The Ketchup Song (Aserejé)" †	Las Ketchup		Mensch †	Herbert Grönemeyer	
14 October	"The Ketchup Song (Aserejé)" †	Las Ketchup		Mensch †	Herbert Grönemeyer	
21 October	"The Ketchup Song (Aserejé)" †	Las Ketchup		Mensch †	Herbert Grönemeyer	
28 October	"The Ketchup Song (Aserejé)" †	Las Ketchup		Mensch †	Herbert Grönemeyer	
4 November	"The Ketchup Song (Aserejé)" †	Las Ketchup		Mensch †	Herbert Grönemeyer	
11 November	"Dilemma"	Nelly featuring Kelly Rowland		Mensch †	Herbert Grönemeyer	
18 November	"Dilemma"	Nelly featuring Kelly Rowland		In den Wahnsinn	Westernhagen	
25 November	"Der Steuersong"	Die Gerd-Show		"Mensch" †	Herbert Grönemeyer	
2 December	"Der Steuersong"	Die Gerd-Show		Escapology	Robbie Williams	
9 December	"Der Steuersong"	Die Gerd-Show		Escapology	Robbie Williams	
16 December	"Der Steuersong"	Die Gerd-Show		Mensch †	Herbert Grönemeyer	
23 December	"Der Steuersong"	Die Gerd-Show		Escapology	Robbie Williams	
30 December	No release (Note: Same issue as for 23 December.)					

== See also ==
- List of number-one hits (Germany)
- List of German airplay number-one songs
