= Let's Go to Bed =

Let's Go to Bed may refer to:

- "Let's Go to Bed" (The Cure song), 1982
- "Let's Go to Bed" (No Angels song), 2002
- Let's Go to Bed (film), a 1972 Shaw Brothers film
