= Let's Go to Bed (No Angels song) =

Single by No Angels

from the album Now... Us!
- Released: 4 November 2002
- Studio: Peppermint Pavilion (Hanover)
- Length: 4:14
- Label: Cheyenne; Polydor; Zeitgeist
- Songwriters: Mustafa Gündogdu; Errol Rennalls
- Producer: Mousse T.

No Angels singles chronology
"Still in Love with You" (2002)	"Let's Go to Bed" (2002)	"All Cried Out" (2002)

"Let's Go to Bed" is a song performed by German pop group No Angels. It was written by Mousse T. and frequent collaborator Errol Rennalls and recorded for the band's second studio album Now... Us! (2002), while production was handled by the former. Musically, the track is a mid-paced pop song that is set in retro style. It contains heavy elements of psychedelic soul and funk music, with its instrumentation led by a bass guitar. "Let's Go to Bed" contains lyrics that reference to a celebration of sexual lust and conquest, leading up to a desire to invite a love interest to come to bed.

The song was well received by contemporary music critics, who cited it the album's standout track and felt it was a breakaway from the Europop genre widely associated with the group; they also praised its production. On 4 November 2002, a beat-heavy remix of "Let's Go to Bed," also produced by Mousse T., was released as the album's third single. It became the group's first single to miss the top ten on the German Singles Chart and would remain the band's lowest-selling single before their disbandment in 2003.

The single's accompanying music video was directed by Marcus Sternberg and filmed inside the New Trade Fair building in Leipzig in early October 2002. It features the girls in black dresses seductively dancing in front of architecture by Gerkan, Marg and Partners and Ian Ritchie Architects. Mousse T. makes a cameo appearance in the video. The band performed the song on several occasions, including Top of the Pops, but while it was omitted from their jubilee album 20, "Let's Go to Bed" was part of Celebration Tour set list.

== Background ==
After a short break from public life at the turn 2001, the members of No Angels reunited in February 2002 to begin working on their second album in Munich and Hamburg. Asked to contribute own ideas and skills to guarantee a more personal effort following the rushed recording of their debut album Elle'ments (2001), each member of the group focused on writing lyrics and melodies on her own—assisted by a wide range of different musicians and songwriters, including Thorsten Brötzmann, Alexander Geringas, Nik Hafemann, Thomas Anders and Christian Geller. Specifically commissioned for Now... Us!, "Let's Go to Bed" was penned by singer-songwriter Errol Rennalls and business partner, producer Mousse T. Production was also helmed by the latter. Recorded at Peppermint Pavilion in Hanover, it was mixed by Mousse T. and Andreas "Spok" Bock. Vocals were arranged by Nik Hafemann, while the guitar was played by Fanfan La Tulipe.

== Reception ==
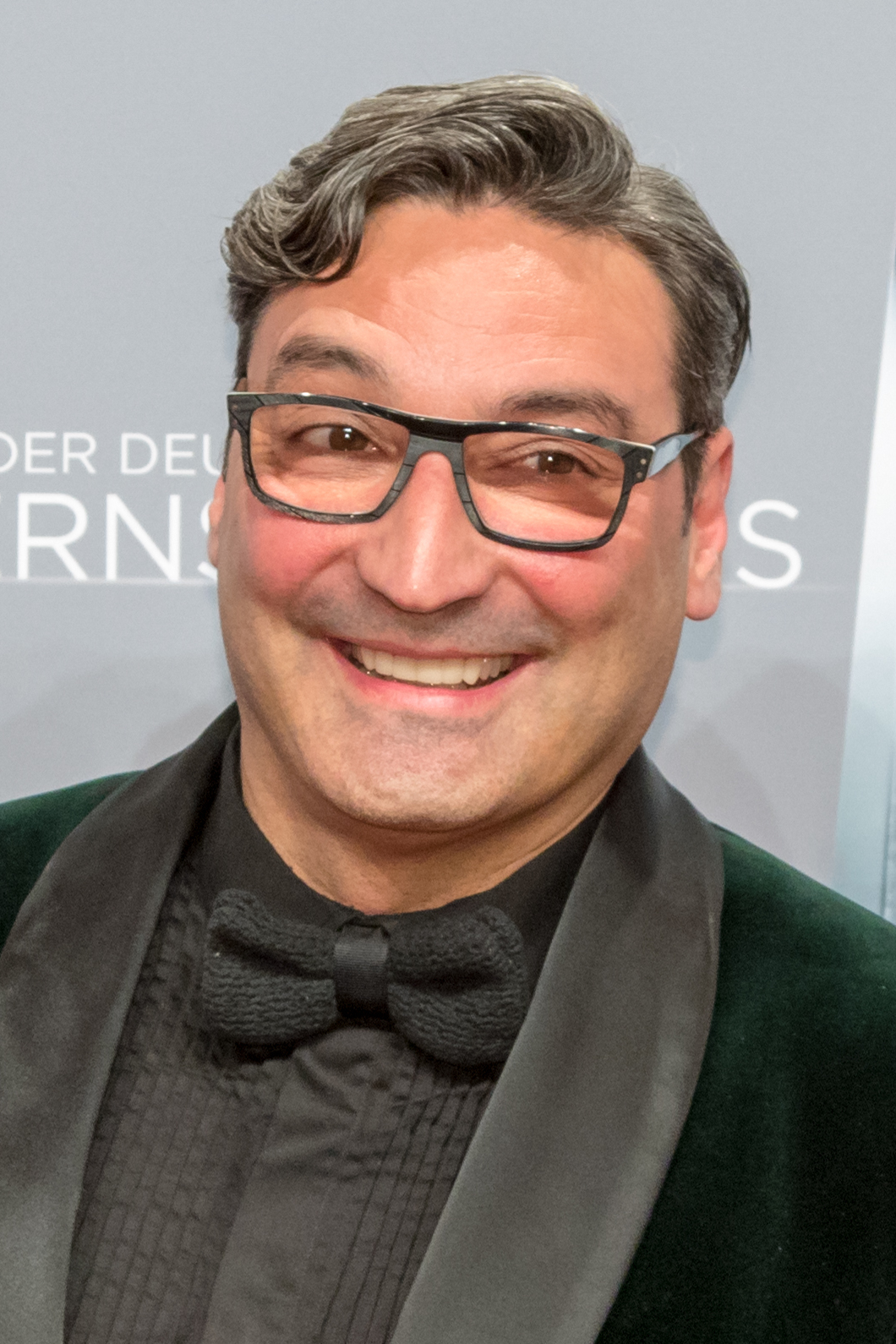
"Let's Go to Bed" was generally praised for Mousse T.'s (pictured) production.

"Let's Go to Bed" received generally favorable reviews from music critics, many of which called it the best song on Now... Us!. Joachim Gauger from Laut.de declared the record the sole "really strong song" on Now... Us!, while Matthias Eisen from CDstarts.de found that it was the only song above "sophisticated average". Music magazine Musikwoche called "Let's Go to Bed" a "racy but modern R&B track" with a quality distinctly above the songs on previous album Elle'ments. Less enthusiastic, Abini Zöllner from Berliner Zeitung wrote that the track felt like "no surprise".

The song marked one of Mousse T. und Errol Rennalls's first collaborations with Universal Music Publishing (UMPG) and their Merge Music company. Released on CD maxi single on 4 November 2002, "Let's go to Bed" debuted and peaked at number twelve on the German Singles Chart on 18 November 2002. It marked the band's lowest-charting single yet and ended their streak of consecutive top ten singles in Germany. It fell out of the top 100 in its tenth week of release. At a sales total of 100,000 copies, it became the band's lowest-selling single before their disbandment in 2003.

In Austria, "Let's go to Bed" debuted at number 59 on 17 November 2002 and reached its peak position, number 46, in its third week on the chart. It was the band's first release to miss the top twenty of chart and fell out of the top 75 in its ninth week. The song remained their lowest-charting single until 2007's "Maybe". In Switzerland, the single completely failed to chart on the Swiss Singles Chart. It would remain No Angels' only song to do so before their disbandment in 2003.

== Music video ==
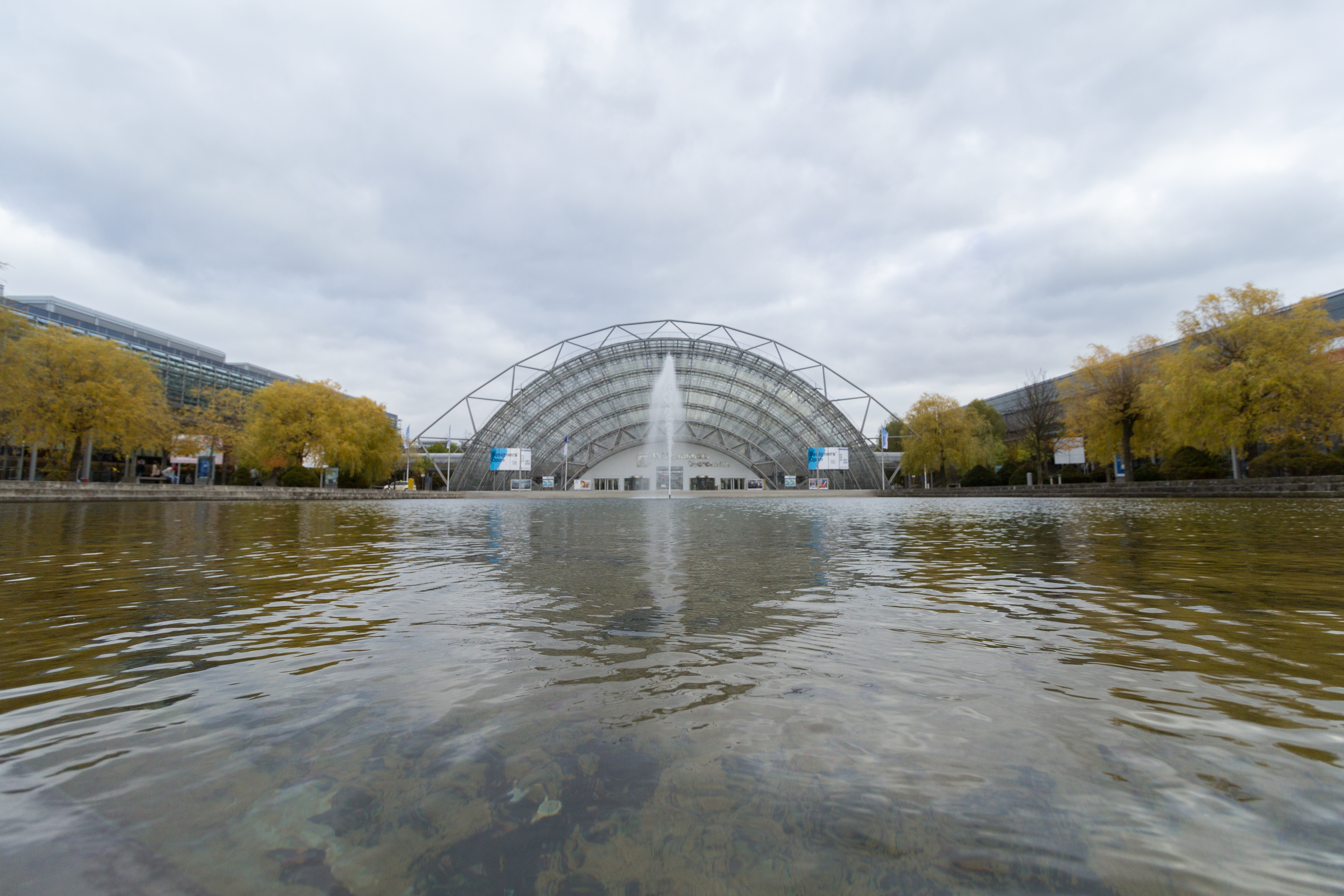
The video for "Let's Go to Bed" was shot at the New Trade Fair building in Leipzig (pictured).

The music video for "Let's Go to Bed" was directed and produced by Marcus Sternberg for Sternberg Filmproduktion and filmed at the New Trade Fair building in Leipzig, Germany in early October 2002. It marked the band's third consecutive collaboration with Sternberg following their work on previous single "Something About Us" and "Still in Love with You". Choreographed by American dancer Sean Cheesman, postproduction on the clip was helmed by Capture Berlin who was accountable for the creation and paste of several different light effects. The final version of "Let's Go to Bed" was eventually premiered on 19 October 2002 on MTV Central's show Brand:Neu.

The plotless clip features the girls in black dresses performing inside the Trade fair glass hall and the adjoining conference center. The girls are also shown in different locations with individual shots as they dance in front of "artistic escalators, futuristic glass walls, a spiral staircase, an oversized silhouette and a glass tube". Vanessa Petruo is seated on a wooden chair with male hands surrounding her head, while Nadja Benaissa is simply walking down the glass hallway. Sandy Mölling is dancing in front of window blinds; Lucy Diakovska performs a routine with two male dancers; and Jessica Wahls is writhing on a brass bedstead. Mousse T is seen in a cameo appearance near the end of the video.

== Track listings ==
Maxi single
No.	Title	Writer(s)	Producer(s)	Length
1.	"Let's Go to Bed" (Single Mix)	Mousse T.; Errol Rennalls	Mousse T.	3:15
2.	"Let's Go to Bed" (Extended Version)	Mousse T.; Rennalls	Mousse T.	5:10
3.	"Let's Go to Bed" (Antiloop Club Mix)	Mousse T.; Rennalls	Mousse T.; Antiloop^{[a]}	7:41
4.	"Let's Go to Bed" (Antiloop Dub Mix)	Mousse T.; Rennalls	Mousse T.; Antiloop^{[a]}	8:14

2-track CD single
No.	Title	Writer(s)	Producer(s)	Length
1.	"Let's Go to Bed" (Single Mix)	Mousse T.; Rennalls	Mousse T.	3:15
2.	"Let's Go to Bed" (Extended Version)	Mousse T.; Rennalls	Mousse T.	5:10

Notes

- ^{^a} denotes additional producer

== Credits and personnel ==
Credits adapted from the liner notes of Now... Us!.

- Nadja Benaissa – vocals
- Lucy Diakovska – vocals
- Fan Fan La Tulip – guitars
- Nik Hafemann – vocal arrangement
- Sandy Mölling – vocals
- Mousse T. – production, mixing, vocal arrangement
- Vanessa Petruo – vocals
- Spok – mixing, engineering
- Jessica Wahls – vocals

== Charts ==
Weekly chart performance for "Let's Go to Bed"
Chart (2002)	Peak position
Austria (Ö3 Austria Top 40)	46
Europe (Eurochart Hot 100)	46
Germany (GfK)	12

== Release history ==
Release dates and formats for "Let's Go to Bed"
Region	Date	Format	Label	Edition(s)	Ref
Various	24 June 2002	CD maxi single; digital download	Cheyenne; Polydor	Album Version	
Various	4 November 2002	CD maxi single; digital download	Cheyenne; Polydor	Single Mix	
