= Now... Us! =

Studio album by No Angels
- Released: 24 June 2002
- Length: 47:18
- Labels: Cheyenne; Poyldor
- Producers: Tim Brettschneider; Thorsten Brötzmann; D. Fact; Fahrenheit & Kelvin; Frank Hellum; Frank Lio; Leslie Mándoki; Mousse T.; Nick Nice; N-Dee; Peter Ries; Royal Garden Sound; Pontus Söderqvist; Sandi Schumann; Syndicate; Daniel Troha; Ronny Wikmark

No Angels chronology
Elle'ments (2001)	Now... Us! (2002)	When the Angels Swing (2002)

Singles from Now ... Us!
- 1. "Something About Us" Released: 6 May 2002; 2. "Still in Love with You" Released: 12 August 2002; 3. "Let's Go to Bed" Released: 4 November 2002; 4. "All Cried Out" Released: 2 December 2002

Now... Us! is the second studio album by German girl group No Angels. It was released by Polydor and Cheyenne Records on June 24, 2002, in German-speaking Europe. Recorded after the release of the band's majorly successful debut album Elle'ments (2001), the group consulted work by frequent collaborators Thorsten Brötzmann, Peter Ries, and Leslie Mándoki as well as international songwriters and producers such as Anders Bagge, Figge Boström, Dennis Dowlut, Mousse T., Pontus Söderqvist, and Quiz & Larossi, while taking a wider role in contributing own lyrics and melodies to the album.

Upon its release, Now... Us! received a mixed reception from music critics, many of whom praised band for their vocal performances and the inclusion of self-penned solo songs but found the material too generic and cliché-addled. Commercially, it became No Angels's second album to debut atop the German Albums Chart and was eventually certified double platinum by the Bundesverband Musikindustrie (BVMI), finishing twelfth on the national year-end chart in 2002. Now... Us! also opened at number two and number four in Austria and Switzerland, where it reached gold status respectively.

The album spawned three singles, including the band's third non-consecutive number-one "Something About Us", summer-lite "Still in Love with You" and funk-influenced "Let's Go to Bed", A pop version of its fourth single, the Alison Moyet cover "All Cried Out", appeared on a Special Winter Edition reissue of the album, released in November 2002. To promote Now... Us!, No Angels embarked on the Four Seasons Tour, covering Austria, Germany, and Switzerland, in fall 2002. It would remain the group's final album as a quintet after Jessica Wahls's departure in 2003 and their reformation as a quartet in 2007.

== Background ==
In 2000, No Angels beat 4,500 other hopefuls in the German version of the RTL II talent show Popstars. Recruited to join a girl pop band, the quintet signed a recording deal with Polydor–Zeitgeist and Cheyenne Records and became overnight hits, with their debut single "Daylight in Your Eyes" emerging as the biggest-selling single of the year 2001 in Germany. For the production of their English language parent album, Cheyenne consulted a small group of German-based musicians to work on Elle'ments, including Thorsten Brötzmann, Peter Ries, Leslie Mándoki, and Peter Plate. Selecting songs from the Universal Music Publishing Group catalogue, the producers would either take over production duties from Scandinavian musicians or submit self-written songs for recording.

A pop record incorporating genres such as Europop, teen pop, electro, and dance, Elle'ments drew on elements of pop rock, drum and bass, and contemporary R&B. Although it became one of the fastest-selling German albums in music history, No Angels continued to face the clichés and prejudices associated with their manufactured band image. Their origins on reality TV led some to perceive them as externally controlled products rather than ambitious artists. Frustrated by both the group's public image and its A&R-driven musical development, band member Vanessa Petruo sought to be released from her contract after her first year with the group. However, she reconsidered after Cheyenne Records agreed to support her desire for greater creative control and offered the group the opportunity to contribute original material to their next album. While still on their Rivers of Joy Tour, Petruo and her bandmates Nadja Benaissa and Sandy Mölling consequently began writing songs individually for the album.

== Production ==
In February 2002, after a short break from public, No Angels began work on their second album in Munich and Hamburg. Complying their wishes to take a bigger in the production of their sophomore effort, Cheyenne Records arranged for them to reteam with Thorsten Brötzmann, Peter Ries, and Leslie Mándoki, all of whom had contributed to their debut album Elle'ments, to work on new songs. Brötzmann and his co-producer Joachim "Jeo" Mezei oversaw production on the Anders Bagge-penned R&B song "Lovestory" as well as "Now That We Found Love", one of five solo songs on the album. Lead sung by band member Vanessa Petruo, it chronicles a woman's desire to love-making with her new lover. Petruo also collaborated with the duo and songwriter Alex Geringas on the uptempo song "Something About Us" which blends contemporary R&B and dance-pop with soft Latin-pop and was conceived as response to what the band felt was intense and sometimes unfair and inaccurate media criticism at the time, predominantly resulting from the clichés and prejudices generally associated with their manufactured band image.

Ries produced "Three Words", a Quiz & Larossi-written rock pop-tinged track that was later included on the album's reissue, and worked with Sandy Mölling on her solo song "Say Goodbye", an R&B-flavored uptempo song which she co-wrote over a demo track by British singer Celetia Martin. Mándoki contributed the uplifting mid-tempo track "Push Me to the Limit" and worked with Wahls on her solo song "Shield Against My Sorrow", a downtempo ode to a loved one. "Atlantis", his production of No Angels's cover version of the same-titled 1968 song, which the band had re-recorded with original singer Donovan for the closing credits of the Walt Disney Feature Animation picture Atlantis: The Lost Empire (2001), was also included on the track listing. Lucy Diakovska collaborated with producers Oliver Fahrenheit and Christian Kelvin on her solo song "Stay", a piano-driven ballad on which she demands her lover to stay for another night with her; while Nadja Benaissa teamed with Daniel Troha on "Come Back", another piano ballad that has her asking for a loved one to return.

Apart from their previous collaborators, Polydor also consulted Mousse T and frequent collaborators Oliver Dommaschk and Marco Quast from production duo Royal Garden Sound to work with the band. Known for his mixture of the house and funk genres, Mousse reteamed with Errol Rennalls, his co-writer on the hit singles "Horny '98" (1998) and "Sex Bomb" (2000), on "Let's Go to Bed", a mid-paced pop song that contains heavy elements of psychedelic soul and references to a celebration of sexual lust and conquest. Dommaschk and Quast contributed album opener "Anchor Your Love" a beat- and guitar-heavy uptempo pop song which they co-wrote with Kaidy-Ann Morgan and that has the protagonist wondering about how she can retains a man's love. Swedish producers Pontus Söderqvist and Nick Nice from songwriting collective LaCarr produced "Still in Love with You", a Latin pop ballad which has the female protagonist thinking deeply over her relationship with her love interest from whom she parted, and "Autumn Breeze", penned by the Australian band Disco Montego, consisting of the Dowlut brothers Dennis and Darren.

== Promotion ==
Originally, "2 Get Over U" was planned as a duet between No Angels and British Popstars winners Hear'Say and was intended to serve as the album's lead single. The release was scheduled for around Christmas 2001, with the dual purpose of promoting both groups across their respective markets and competing for the coveted Christmas number-one spot on the UK Singles Chart, traditionally one of the most competitive periods in the British music market. At the time, both groups had enjoyed considerable success in their respective home markets. However, while Hear'Say had scored a major UK hit with "Pure and Simple" and No Angels had achieved similar success in Germany with "Daylight in Your Eyes," neither group had been able to replicate the same level of chart success in the other group's home market. The plans were eventually shelved as the promotional strategies for both groups shifted, leaving "2 Get Over U" to be reworked for No Angels' subsequent album without Hear'Say’s involvement.

A planned February or March 2002 release of "2 Get Over U" was ultimately abandoned after the album's recording sessions were delayed and the group insisted on selecting a different song as the first single from Now... Us!. The band chose "Something About Us," which all five members favored and considered to carry a significantly stronger message. As with "Daylight in Your Eyes," the group ultimately prevailed over their record label and management, both of whom had initially expressed reservations about the song's media-critical message. A cover of "Like Ice in the Sunshine," recorded by No Angels for a 2002 Langnese advertising campaign, was subsequently included as the B-side of "Something About Us." Released on 6 May 2002, "Something About Us" became No Angels' third non-consecutive number-one single in both Germany and Austria within a period of 16 months, while reaching number 11 on the Swiss Singles Chart. It earned Top of the Pops Award and the ECHO Award nominations.

Now... Us!'s second single, "Still in Love with You," was released on 12 August 2002. The band and their record label had hoped to score another number-one hit in Germany with the single, but their ambitions were thwarted by Herbert Grönemeyer's "Mensch," which held "Still in Love with You" off the top spot for two consecutive weeks. The song also reached the top ten in Austria, Poland, and Switzerland and was awarded the NRJ Music Award for Best German Song the following year. Third single "Let's Go to Bed" was produced by Mousse T., who substantially reworked the track for its single release. While the album version drew on psychedelic soul and funk influences, the new version featured a heavier beat and a more pronounced club-oriented sound. The single, issued on 4 November 2002, ended No Angels' run of consecutive top-ten hits in Germany and failed to chart on the Swiss Singles Chart. A fourth single, a previously unreleased cover of Alison Moyet's "All Cried Out," was released on 2 December 2002 and included on Special Winter Edition reissue of Now... Us!. It reached the top 20 of the German Singles Chart.

== Critical reception ==
Professional ratings
Review scores
Source	Rating
CDStarts	2/10
laut.de	2.5/5 stars

Now... Us! received mixed reviews from contemporary critics, who variously praised its more mature pop and R&B-oriented sound while criticizing its songwriting, reliance on established pop formulas, and cover versions. MusikWoche considered the alum a clear improvement over the group's debut, calling it a "promising first step" toward establishing No Angels as a more serious pop act. Robert Morawa of Bayern 3 likewise described it as a varied and entertaining pop album, praising the individual contributions of the five members, particularly Lucy Diakovska's "Stay" and Nadja Benaissa's "Come Back," while noting the influence of Destiny's Child on songs by Sandy Mölling and Jessica Wahls. The editorial staff of ProSieben praised the album's blend of pop, R&B, dance, and choral elements, highlighting "Stay", "Comeback", "Something About Us", "Autumn Breeze", and "Anchor Your Love." However, it found "Say Goodbye" and "Shield Against My Sorrow" less convincing because of their familiar lyrics and lack of musical highlights, describing the album as representative of the mainstream pop sound of 2002.

Writing for Brainstorms!, Sachar Kriwoj praised the No Angels' development beyond their Popstars origins, viewing Now... Us! as an attempt to establish them as serious artists. He highlighted the individual contributions of all five members and the album's more mature songwriting, but considered "Something About Us" its only obvious single and questioned whether its sophisticated material would appeal to the group's young audience, concluding that it might be "too good for the No Angels of the present." Joachim Gauger of laut.de gave the album a mixed assessment, praising several of its R&B-, soul-, and funk-influenced tracks but criticizing the self-written songs for their "wooden" and clichéd lyrics. He credited producer Thorsten Brötzmann with giving the album a contemporary sound, while criticizing "Atlantis 2002" and "Like Ice in the Sunshine" and naming "Let's Go to Bed" its strongest track. CDStarts editor Matthias Eisen was considerably more negative, awarding the album 2 out of 10. He criticized its songwriting, production, and cover versions, describing the self-written material as clichéd and kitschy and the R&B- and soul-influenced sound as derivative. He singled out "Atlantis 2002" and "Like Ice in the Sunshine" for particular criticism, while considering "Let's Go to Bed" the only above-average track and concluding that the album showed little artistic progression from Elle'ments.

== Commercial performance ==
Upon its release, Now... Us! became No Angels' second consecutive studio album to top the German Albums Chart, while also reaching number two and number four on the Austrian and Swiss Albums Charts, respectively. It also peaked at number seven on the European Top 100 Albums chart and number 65 in Hungary. The album spent 33 weeks on the German chart and 20 weeks on the Austrian chart, where it ranked number 29 on the 2002 year-end chart. In Germany, it finished at number 12 on the year-end chart. In November 2002, Billboard reported that Now... Us! had sold 350,000 copies in Germany and a further 150,000 internationally since its June release. The album was certified platinum by the Bundesverband Musikindustrie (BVMI) for 300,000 certified units, while receiving gold certifications in Austria and Switzerland for certified shipments of 15,000 and 20,000 units, respectively.

== Track listing ==
Now ... Us! – Standard edition
No.	Title	Writer(s)	Producer(s)	Length
1.	"Anchor Your Love"	Oliver Dommaschk; Marco Quast; Kaidy-Ann Morgan	Royal Garden Sound	3:38
2.	"Something About Us"	Vanessa Petruo; Thorsten Brötzmann; Alexander Geringas	Brötzmann; Jeo^{[A]}	3:26
3.	"Still in Love with You"	Figge Boström; Johan Lindman	Pontus Söderqvist; Nick Nice	3:31
4.	"Push Me to the Limit"	Leslie Mándoki; Laszlo Bencker	Mándoki	3:23
5.	"Say Goodbye"	Sandy Mölling; Celetia Martin; Velroy Baily; Ian Pitter	Peter Ries	3:37
6.	"Like Ice in the Sunshine"	Holger Julian Copp; Hanno Harders	N-Dee; Frank Lio; D. Fact	2:57
7.	"Lovestory"	Reed Vertenley; Anders Bagge; Par Åström	Brötzmann; Jeo^{[A]}	3:35
8.	"Shield Against My Sorrow"	Jessica Wahls; Nik Hafemann; Mándoki; Bencker	Mándoki	3:29
9.	"Autumn Breeze"	D. Dowlut	Söderqvist; Nice	3:32
10.	"Now That We Found Love"	Ulrich Wehner; Brötzmann	Brötzmann	3:34
11.	"Stay"	Lucy Diakovska; Christian Geller	Oliver Fahrenheit; Christian Kelvin	4:09
12.	"Let's Go to Bed"	Mousse T.; Errol Rennalls	Mousse T.	3:32
13.	"2 Get Over U"	Sandi Schumann; Tim Brettschneider; Alan Glass	Frank Hellum; Ronny Wikmark	3:24
14.	"Lost in You"	Schumann; Brettschneider; Glass	Schumann; Brettschneider	3:28
15.	"Come Back"	Nadja Benaissa; Daniel Troha; Cal Abate	Troha	4:02
16.	"Atlantis 2002" (with Donovan)	Donovan Leitch	Mándoki	4:01
Total length:				47:18

Now ... Us! – Special Winter Edition
No.	Title	Writer(s)	Producer(s)	Length
1.	"All Cried Out" (Pop Version)	Steve Jolley; Alison Moyet; Tony Swain	Hafemann; Perky Park	3:38
2.	"Still in Love with You" (Single Version)	Boström; Lindman	Söderqvist; Nice	3:31
3.	"Something About Us" (Latin Radio Edit)	Petruo; Brötzmann; Geringas	Brötzmann; Jeo^{[A]}	3:26
4.	"Three Words"	Andreas Romdhane; Josef Larossi	Ries	3:48
5.	"Let's Go to Bed" (Single Edit)	Mousse T.; Rennalls	Mousse T.	3:32
6.	"Say Goodbye"	Mölling; Martin; Baily; Pitter	Ries	3:37
7.	"Lovestory"	Vertenley; Bagge; Åström	Brötzmann; Jeo^{[A]}	3:35
8.	"Stay"	Diakovska; Geller	Fahrenheit; Kelvin	4:09
9.	"Autumn Breeze"	Dowlut	Söderqvist; Nice	3:32
10.	"2 Get Over U"	Schumann; Brettschneider; Glass	Hellum; Wikmark	3:24
11.	"Shield Against My Sorrow"	Wahls; Hafemann; Mándoki; Bencker	Mándoki	3:29
12.	"Anchor Your Love"	Dommaschk; Quast; Morgan	Royal Garden Sound	3:38
13.	"Now That We Found Love"	Wehner; Brötzmann	Brötzmann	3:34
14.	"Like Ice in the Sunshine"	Copp; Harders	N-Dee; Frank Lio; D. Fact	2:57
15.	"Come Back"	Benaissa; Troha; Abate	Troha	4:02
16.	"Daylight in Your Eyes" (Big Band Version)	Tony Bruno; Tommy Byrne	Till Brönner	3:44
Total length:				56:58

Notes

- ^{^[A]} denotes co-producer

== Credits and personnel ==
Credits adapted from the liner notes of Now... Us!.

Performers and musicians

- Curly Ausmer – guitar
- Thorsten Brötzmann – keyboards, guitar
- Laszlo Benker – various
- Jewgeni Birkhoff – electric piano
- Bela "B. La" Brauckmann – percussion
- Sven Bünger – acoustic guitar
- James Caldwell – backing vocalist
- Julian Feifel – various
- Linda Freeland – backing vocalist
- Thorsten Fuchs – guitar
- Inez Haynes – backing vocalist
- Stravos Iannou – acoustic guitar
- Fan Fan La Tulip – guitar
- Manfred Honetschläger – conductor
- Sami Khatib – various
- Michael Knauer – keyboards
- George Kopecsni – various
- Peter Koobs – guitar
- Franca Morgano – backing vocalist
- Johan Lindman – guitar
- S.L.O. Warschau – strings
- Ossi Schalle – various
- Ingo Schröder – rhythm guitar
- Berni Schwarz – various
- Daniel Throa – backing vocalist, keyboard, percussion, guitar
- Peter Weihe – guitar
- Peter Wölpl – various
- Stephan Zeh – various

Technical and artwork

- Peter Boström – mixing engineer
- Tim Brettschneider – producer
- Thorsten Brötzmann – producer, programming
- Dirk Decker – recording engineer
- Fahrenheit & Kelvin – producer
- Pit Floss – mixing engineer
- Nik Hafemann – producer, recording supervisor
- Frank Hellum – producer
- Sven Jacobsen – photography
- Felix Knöchel – engineer
- Dirk Kurock – recording engineer
- Martin Langer – drum programming
- Frank Lio – producer
- Andy "N-Dee" Lutschounig
- Leslie Mándoki – producer
- Joachim "Jeo" Mezei – co-producer, programming
- Mousse T. – engineer, producer
- Nick Nice – mixing engineer, producer, programming
- Perky Park – producer
- Ronald Rensberg – artwork
- Peter Ries – producer
- Royal Garden Sound – producer
- Pontus Söderqvist – producer, programming
- Sandi "S." Schumann – producer
- Spok – engineer
- Mike "Spike" Streefkerk – mixing engineer
- Syndicate – producer
- Daniel Troha – producer
- Wolfgang "D. Fact" von Webenau – producer
- Ronny Wikmark – producer
- Benjamin Wolf – photography
- Stephan Zeh – mixing engineer

== Charts ==
=== Weekly charts ===
Weekly chart performance for Now... Us!
Chart (2002)	Peak position
Austrian Albums (Ö3 Austria)	2
European Top 100 Albums (Billboard)	7
German Albums (Offizielle Top 100)	1
Hungarian Albums (MAHASZ)	65
Swiss Albums (Schweizer Hitparade)	4

=== Year-end charts ===
Year-end chart performance for Now... Us!
Chart (2002)	Position
Austrian Albums (Ö3 Austria)	29
European Top 100 Albums (Billboard)	89
German Albums (Official Top 100)	12
Swiss Albums (Schweizer Hitparade)	62

== Certifications ==
Certifications for Now... Us!
Region	Certification	Certified units/sales
Austria (IFPI Austria)	Gold	15,000^{*}
Germany (BVMI)	Platinum	300,000^{^}
Switzerland (IFPI Switzerland)	Gold	20,000^{^}
^{*} Sales figures based on certification alone.^{^} Shipments figures based on certification alone.

== Release history ==
Now... Us! release history
Region	Date	Edition(s)	Format	Label
Austria	24 June 2002	Standard	Digital download; CD	Cheyenne; Polydor
Germany	24 June 2002	Standard	Digital download; CD	Cheyenne; Polydor
Switzerland	24 June 2002	Standard	Digital download; CD	Cheyenne; Polydor
Austria	18 November 2002	Special winter	Digital download; CD	Cheyenne; Polydor
Germany	18 November 2002	Special winter	Digital download; CD	Cheyenne; Polydor
Switzerland	18 November 2002	Special winter	Digital download; CD	Cheyenne; Polydor
