= List of number-one hits of 2002 (Austria) =

This is a list of the Austrian Singles Chart number-one hits of 2002.

Issue date	Song	Artist
6 January	"I Believe"	Bro'Sis
13 January	"I Believe"	Bro'Sis
20 January	"I Believe"	Bro'Sis
27 January	"I Believe"	Bro'Sis
3 February	"What If"	Kate Winslet
10 February	"How You Remind Me"	Nickelback
17 February	"Whenever, Wherever"	Shakira
24 February	"How You Remind Me"	Nickelback
3 March	"Whenever, Wherever"	Shakira
10 March	"Whenever, Wherever"	Shakira
17 March	"Whenever, Wherever"	Shakira
24 March	"Whenever, Wherever"	Shakira
31 March	"Whenever, Wherever"	Shakira
7 April	"Whenever, Wherever"	Shakira
14 April	"Engel"	Ben featuring Gim
21 April	"Engel"	Ben featuring Gim
28 April	"Engel"	Ben featuring Gim
5 May	"Like a Prayer"	Mad'House
12 May	"Like a Prayer"	Mad'House
19 May	"Like a Prayer"	Mad'House
26 May	"If Tomorrow Never Comes"	Ronan Keating
2 June	"Something About Us"	No Angels
9 June	"Without Me"	Eminem
16 June	"Without Me"	Eminem
23 June	"Without Me"	Eminem
30 June	"Without Me"	Eminem
7 July	"Without Me"	Eminem
14 July	"Underneath Your Clothes"	Shakira
21 July	"Was is' mit du?"	Professor Kaiser
28 July	"Was is' mit du?"	Professor Kaiser
4 August	"Was is' mit du?"	Professor Kaiser
11 August	"Without Me"	Eminem
18 August	"Without Me"	Eminem
25 August	"Without Me"	Eminem
1 September	"Mensch"	Herbert Grönemeyer
8 September	"Mensch"	Herbert Grönemeyer
15 September	"Mensch"	Herbert Grönemeyer
22 September	"Mensch"	Herbert Grönemeyer
29 September	"The Ketchup Song (Aserejé)"	Las Ketchup
6 October	"The Ketchup Song (Aserejé)"	Las Ketchup
13 October	"The Ketchup Song (Aserejé)"	Las Ketchup
20 October	"The Ketchup Song (Aserejé)"	Las Ketchup
27 October	"The Ketchup Song (Aserejé)"	Las Ketchup
3 November	"The Ketchup Song (Aserejé)"	Las Ketchup
10 November	"The Ketchup Song (Aserejé)"	Las Ketchup
17 November	"The Ketchup Song (Aserejé)"	Las Ketchup
24 November	"The Ketchup Song (Aserejé)"	Las Ketchup
1 December	"The Ketchup Song (Aserejé)"	Las Ketchup
8 December	"The Ketchup Song (Aserejé)"	Las Ketchup
15 December	"The Ketchup Song (Aserejé)"	Las Ketchup
22 December	"Der Steuersong (Las Kanzlern)"	Die Gerd-Show
29 December	"Der Steuersong (Las Kanzlern)"	Die Gerd-Show

== See also ==
- 2002 in music
