= Welcome to the Dance =

Studio album by No Angels
- Released: 11 September 2009
- Recorded: 2008–2009
- Length: 50:06
- Label: Polydor; Universal
- Producer: Hakim Bell; Arnthor Birgisson; Bill Blast; Akene Dunkley; Adam Messinger; Nasri; Aaron Pearce

No Angels chronology
| Very Best of No Angels (2008) | Welcome to the Dance (2009) | 20 (2021) |

Singles from Welcome to the Dance
- 1. "One Life" Released: 21 August 2009

Welcome to the Dance is the fifth studio album by all-female German pop group No Angels, released by Polydor and Universal Music Domestic throughout German-speaking Europe on 11 September 2009. The band's second post-reunion effort following their reformation as a quartet in 2007, it was written, produced and recorded in Berlin, Los Angeles, and New York City between the years of 2008 and 2009, featuring production by Nasri, Hakim Bell, Bill Blast, Adam Messinger, and Aaron Pearce, among others.

After releasing lukewarm-received comeback album Destiny (2007) and their performance at the Eurovision Song Contest 2008, the band collaborated with a range of American and Canadian producers and songwriters on the album. Pursuing a new musical direction, Welcome to the Dance took the group's work further into the dance and electronic genre, introducing a more international sound. However, upon release, the album received generally mixed reviews by critics, who criticized the band for their missing individuality.

Commercially, the album underperformed, becoming the group's lowest-charting effort to date. In Germany, it debuted and peaked at number twenty-six, becoming the band's first regular album neither to reach the top ten nor the top twenty. The album's leading track "One Life", still made it to the top twenty on the German Singles Chart. A second single, titled "Derailed", was actually scheduled for a 27 November release but was scrapped for unknown reasons. Welcome to the Dance would remain No Angels' last studio album until their 2021 reunion on 20, as the band disbanded after the album's release.

== Background ==
While No Angels' comeback album Destiny (2007) was a commercial success, it received generally lukewarm reviews from music critics and, in comparison to earlier successes, it underperformed with a domestic sales total of about 30,000 copies. From all four regular single releases, leading single "Goodbye to Yesterday" emerged as the album's only top ten hit, and although both the group members and record company Universal Music felt increasing discontent and uncertainty about the direction of the project by summer 2007, it was not until the band's participation in the Eurovision Song Contest 2008 in Belgrade, Serbia, the quartet hit an all-time career low, following their performance with the German ESC entry "Disappear", which finished 23rd out of the 25 countries that participated in the final voting in May 2008. As a direct consequence, planned recordings for the band's next studio album during the summer were indefinitely delayed, and the group went on a two-month hiatus to rethink and analyze the past year.

Having managed themselves since their reunion, they eventually agreed on signing a contract with Kool Management in July 2008 after several meetings with Khalid Schröder at the beginning of the year. Schröder, a former event manager and head of the German management of Aura Dione and Kool & the Gang, subsequently arranged meetings with his North American clients for No Angels, including Canadian singer-songwriter Nasri Atweh and hip-hop producer Hakim "Prince Hakim" Bell, son of Kool founding member Robert Bell. In August 2008, whilst Nadja Benaissa spent her summer holidays with her daughter in Los Angeles, California, he spontaneously decided to send fellow band members Lucy Diakovska, Sandy Mölling, and Jessica Wahls overseas to join Benaissa for writing and recording sessions at Donnie Wahlberg's mansion, eventually green-lighting the start of the project.

== Conception and production ==
Most of Welcome to the Dance was written and recorded during five separate studio sessions in Los Angeles and New York City in the United States, and Berlin and Rastede in Germany between August 2008 and March 2009. The first session in Los Angeles in August 2008 was overseen by Aaron Pearce and Nasri Atweh, who decided on splitting the band into two-halves during the writing process, leaving Benaissa and Diakovska with Pearce and The Writing Camp members Evan "Kidd" Bogart and David "DQ" Quiñones, while Mölling and Wahls remained with Adam Messinger and Atweh. The teams crafted four songs within three days of which all made the final track listing, including "Young Love", "Shut Yout Mouth", and "Up Against the Wall". In the same week, the band met with songwriter Rick Nowels in Santa Monica who presented them several of his own demo tracks. The quartet selected ten songs out of his repertoire, of which Nowles agreed on yielding two to the new project. His songs did however not make the cut on the album. The following month, the band re-teamed with Atweh in Berlin to write and record another three songs respectively, including eventual leading single "One Life".

In October 2008, No Angels returned to the United States for additional recording sessions in New Jersey and New York City, where producers and writers Hakim Bell, Akene "The Champ" Dunkley, Bill Blast, and M'Jestie got involved into the project. In addition, the band worked with writer Chel Hill and Karriem Mack and Shaun Owens of production team Soul Diggaz during their US sojourn. As with Nowles, their songs did however not make the final track listing. After another session in Berlin in early December, the band re-teamed with all three main production teams for a two-week stint at Peter Patzer's Bekeeg Studios in Rastede near Oldenburg in January 2010. They were joined by Nicholas "RAS" Furlong, who went on to write and produce vocals on several tracks for Welcome to the Dance. The rest of the album was wrapped at the Hansa Studios in Berlin in February 2009, where Pearce and Atweh wrote and recorded the last tracks with the band, including songs such as "Dance-Aholic".

== Content ==
The album's opening track, "One Life", was one of the first songs ever all band members jointly contributed lyrics to. Conceived during a writing session in Berlin in September 2008, the track was penned over a backing track by New Jersey producers Hakim Bell and Akene Dunkley and created as an anthemic, self-manifesto song about the celebration of life. Greatly influenced by dance-pop and electropop, the track features effects of auto-tuning and sprechgesang during its bridge. The song garnered generally positive reviews by music critics, who noted it the album's standout track, and was released as the album's first and only single from Welcome to the Dance. The album's second track was written by Arnthor Birgisson and Savan Kotecha and deals with the circumstances of a love-hate relationship that the song's protagonist compares to a thunderstorm she feels stuck in. A vocoded, humming male voice provides the bassline of the song, while Jessica Wahls is featured with background vocals only. Third and fourth track "Rebel" and "Welcome to the Dance" are two out of three tracks that were contributed by Bill Blast and Alisha "M'Jestie" Brooks. Brooks wrote "Rebel" over a synthesized instrumental track by Blast, willed to create something "hard" for the band. Lyrically, the up-tempo composition deals with the refusal to fall in love.

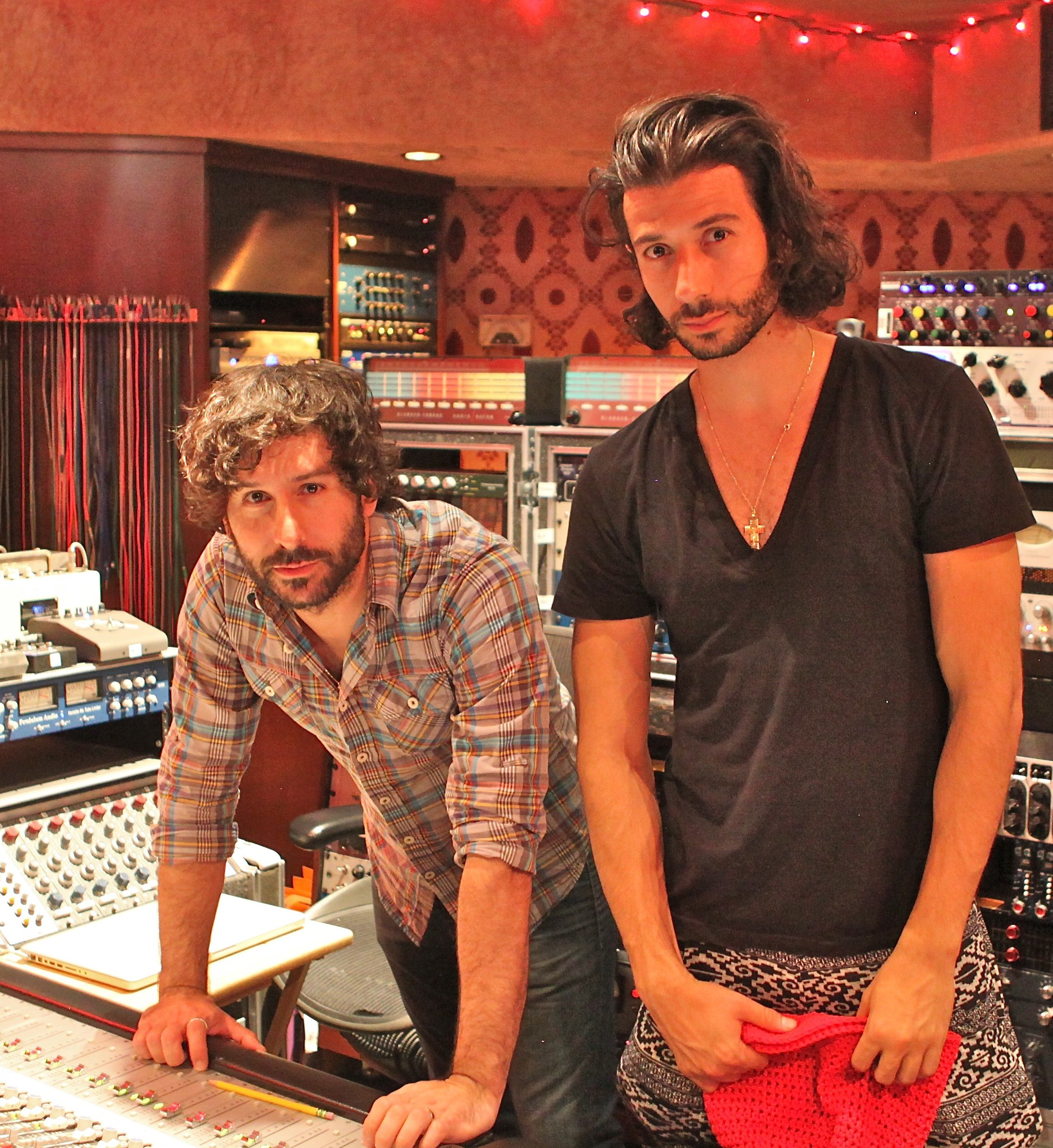
Canadian songwriting and production team The Messengers contributed to Welcome to the Dance.

The album's title song was written as a decidation to "everybody in the club, or to anybody in life that starts off in the club", according to Brooks, and was lyrically inspired by Michael Jackson's 1980 record "Off the Wall". "Derailed", the album's fifth track, was written by Aaron Pearce, Nasri Atweh, and Furlong, and garnered mixed reviews by critics who summed it as "strained" but also highlighted it one of the better songs on the album. A beat-driven piano ballad about a broken relationship, it features leading vocals by Sandy Mölling while Lucy Diakovska appears as a backing vocalist only. Initially scheduled for a 27 November 2009, release, it was eventually scrapped as the album's second single. "Dance-Aholic", an up-tempo anthem about the joy of nightclub dance, was created the day after the aftershow party of the 2009 ECHO Awards where band members Benaissa and Wahls had impressed producers Atweh and Pearce with their dance-craziness. Seventh track "Shut Your Mouth" was one of the first songs the band wrote with Evan "Kidd" Bogart and his The Writing Camp collective during the album's first creative session in Los Angeles, California in August 2008. A musical reckoning with those people who want to ruin someone's reputation, it has been noted as one of the most autobiographical tracks on Welcome to the Dance as every member had the chance "to write things off her chest" with it. Built around a cheerleading motif, it shares similarities with fellow Aaron Pearce production Kreesha Turner's "Passion" (2008). It was also thought to have a similar opening to Janet Jackson's "Feedback".

The ninth track on the album, titled "Young Love", was the first song contributed to the project. The result of a guitar jam session with Adam Messinger and Nasri, it revolves around the facets of a new-found affection, and has been noted as a musical contrast to the highly synthesized and electronic sound of the album due to its acoustic flair and singer-songwriter style. The group noted it the most stereotypical song on Welcome to the Dance. On "Too Old", the album's tenth track, the protagonist requests her lover to get his priorities in order and finally make a decision for or against a relationship with her. It was generally well received by music critics who noted it the "single-worthiest hit" off the album alongside "One Life". "Down Boy" is the only song on Welcome to the Dance not specifically created for or together with No Angels. Written by Tiyon Mack, Chad Roper, Le'che Martin, a demo of the composition, initially produced by Rodney "Darkchild" Jerkins, was to be recorded by some unknown artist before it was eventually handed over to Aaron Pearce. His re-worked version for the band features similar structures however. Twelfth track "Stop", another Blast/Brooks production, chronicles a woman's feelings on her decision to give her failed relationship a second try. Thirteenth track "Minute by Minute" features guest vocals by Nasri Atweh while Benaissa provides the female leading voice. Lyrically, the ballad deals with true love. "Say Goodbye," co-written by Nasri, had been recorded and released the year before by Canadian singer Eva Avila on her second album Give Me the Music (2008).

== Critical response ==
Professional ratings
Review scores
| Source | Rating |
|---|---|
| CDStarts.de | 5/10 |
| laut.de | 1/5 stars |
| Letmenentertainyou.de | 1/5 stars |
| mix1.de | 7/8 |
| MusicHeadQuarters.de | 8/8 |

Welcome to the Dance received generally mixed reviews from music critics, many of whom praised the band for their courage to breakaway from their pop rock sounds on previous releases but found the material uneven. Entertainment magazine Mix1 remarked that the band entered "a new musical dimension with Welcome to the Dance. The title is quite programmatic to understand [...] Mainly up-tempo-numbers, peppered with elaborate beats and incredible effects. Pop meets electro, R&B and soul. New, fresh, surprising and sometimes almost experimental. Definitely international." Astrid Weist, editor for MusicHeadQuarter, complimented No Angels for their decision to revamp their sound and gave the album eight stars out of ten, declaring it "a surprising album in several aspects." Generally satisfied with the inclusion of contemporary dancefloor tracks and familiar sounding ballads, she summed the album a "rather convincing musical mixture."

Tomasz Kurianowicz, writing for Süddeutsche Zeitung, found that the "new No Angels song mix presents itself in a thoroughly international style, with lots of scratchy electro beats, alienation effects and sound mix collages. These songs are probably an excellent reflection of contemporary pop in his claim to perfection along all the rules of art." Lifestyle magazine In Touch felt that "although the 14 songs sound pop in the usual manner, new impulses come from driving beats that lead away from the ballad mentality of past years. Despite the new sound, the four ladies sound more mature, mature and yes, even more diverse than before. It seems they have found themselves and are now where they've always wanted to go with their songs." CDStarts.de writer Tanja Kraus gave the album five out of ten stars and complimented its international niveau and self-penned, well-produced pop character. Otherwise, she criticised the album for its "missing individuality and corresponding soul", and the "predominant amount of fillers as against the number of possible chart hits."

Pooltrax felt that the album was only partially answering expectations, and although they were persuaded that the band had not made the most out of it, they complimented No Angels for their songwriting and the corresponding results which they compared to a "whiff of Rihanna". Critic Eberhard Dobler, reviewer for laut.de, was disappointed with the album and declared it out-dated, writing: "To put it straight: Everything remains the same. The four ladies are first and foremost interpreters. If you are seriously interested in bands, you will not win much from such a product, no matter how you create sound and singing [...] Suchlike sound may be new to No Angels. But indeed, it's an old hat – why didn't they come around with this on [previous album] Destiny (2007)?" He gave the album one out of five stars. In his consumer guide for LetMeEntertainYou.de, Michael Bauer also rated the album one star out of five, summing it "a dance towards career ending." He felt that Welcome to the Dance was "nothing but monotonous club stamping", and dismissed the heavy usage of effects on the voices and beats.

== Release and performance ==
The band expected the production of Welcome to the Dance to last longer than any work on previous records, and thus, a scheduled release date was not set prior to spring or summer 2009, respectively. On 8 June 2009, producer Aaron Pearce announced on his official MySpace account, that he had put the final touches on the album and it "should be out by the end of the summer." Two weeks later, the band's official webpage went under construction and a countdown, dated at 25 July, was started. On 3 July 2009, No Angels made their first appearance in four months at the Sankt Pölten Stadtfest in Lower Austria, where they held their first official press conference after Benaissa's April 2009 arrest and performed both old tracks and five news songs from the upcoming album, including "Derailed", "Shut Your Mouth", "Tool Old", "Young Love" and "One Life". In the same night, the band announced "One Life" as the album's first single during the concert. On 15 July 2010, the album was previewed to about 200 journalists and other media representatives at the Astor Film Lounge theatre at the Berlin Kurfürstendamm, where the band revealed the album title as Welcome to the Dance.

Finally released on 11 September 2009, in German-speaking Europe, Welcome to the Dance debuted at number twenty-six on the German Albums Chart. This marked the band's lowest-selling debut week for any of their album releases. Since the album failed to reach either the top ten or the top twenty of the national albums chart and eventually fell out of the top 100 in its third week, it also became No Angels' lowest-charting regular studio album yet, resulting in lackluster sales in general and the release of just one single. In Austria, the album debuted at number sixty-five in its only week on the Austrian Albums Chart. Like in Germany, Welcome to the Dance became the group's lowest-charting album here yet, making it their first longplayer not to debut within the top twenty. In Switzerland, the album barely managed to reach the top 100 on the Swiss Albums Chart, debuting and peaking at number ninety-five only. It became the band's first album not to reach the top thirty at least.

== Track listing ==
Welcome to the Dance track listing
| No. | Title | Writer(s) | Producer(s) | Length |
|---|---|---|---|---|
| 1. | "One Life" | Nasri Atweh; Hakim Bell; Akene Dunkley; Adam Messinger; Nadja Benaissa; Lucy Diakovska; Sandy Mölling; Jessica Wahls | Bell; Dunkley; Nasri^{[A]}; The Messinger^{[A]} | 3:37 |
| 2. | "Thunderstorm" | Arnthor Birgisson; Savan Kotecha; Bill Blast; Peter Patzer; Diakovska | Arnthor; Blast^{[A]} | 3:48 |
| 3. | "Rebel" | Blast; Alisha "M'Jestie" Brooks | Blast | 3:47 |
| 4. | "Welcome to the Dance" | Blast; Brooks | Blast | 3:26 |
| 5. | "Derailed" | Blast; Aaron Pearce; Atweh; Nick Furlong | Pearce | 3:44 |
| 6. | "Dance-Aholic" | Pearce; Atweh | Pearce | 3:59 |
| 7. | "Shut Your Mouth" | Pearce; Evan "Kidd" Bogart; David Quiñones; Benaissa; Diakovska | Pearce | 3:20 |
| 8. | "Up Against the Wall" | Pearce; Bogart; Quiñones; Mölling; Wahls | Pearce | 3:13 |
| 9. | "Young Love" | Atweh; Messinger; Mölling; Wahls | Messinger | 3:15 |
| 10. | "Too Old" | Atweh; Messinger; Diakovska | Messinger | 3:10 |
| 11. | "Down Boy" | Pearce; Tiyon Mack; Chad Roper; Le'che Martin | Pearce | 3:47 |
| 12. | "Stop" | Blast; Brooks | Blast | 3:59 |
| 13. | "Minute by Minute" (featuring Nasri) | Birgisson; Kotecha | Arnthor; Pearce^{[A]} | 3:47 |
| 14. | "Say Goodbye" | Atweh; Messinger | Messinger | 3:16 |
| Total length: | | | | 50:06 |

Notes

- ^{^[A]} denotes co-producer

== Personnel and credits ==
Credits adapted from the liner notes of Welcome to the Dance.

- Nasri – production, backing vocals
- Adil Bayyan – executive production
- Hakim Bell – production, instrumentation, programming
- Arnthor Birgisson – production
- Bill Blast – production, vocal production, instrumentation, engineering, mixing
- Alisha Brooks – vocal production, arranger
- Akene Dunkley – production, instrumentation, programming
- Nick Furlong – engineering
- Alex Greggs – Pro Tools editing, special FX
- Tiyon "TC" Mack – arranger
- Adam Messinger – production, instrumentation, mixing
- Rashad Muhammad – engineering
- Carlos Oyanedel – mixing assistance
- Peter Patzer – instrumentation, vocal production, engineering, mixing
- Aaron Pearce – production, vocal production, instrumentation, programming, engineering
- Herb Powers – mastering
- David "DQ" Quinones – arranger
- Khalid Schröder – executive production
- Phil Tan – mixing
- Ben Wolf – photography

== Charts ==
Chart performance for Welcome to the Dance
| Chart (2009) | Peak position |
|---|---|
| Austrian Albums (Ö3 Austria) | 65 |
| German Albums (Offizielle Top 100) | 26 |
| Swiss Albums (Schweizer Hitparade) | 95 |

== Release history ==
Welcome to the Dance release history
| Region | Date | Format | Label | Ref(s) |
|---|---|---|---|---|
| Various | 11 September 2009 | Digital download; CD | Universal Music Domestic Pop | |
