= Mad Wild =

Single by No Angels

from the album 20
- Released: 6 August 2021
- Length: 2:39
- Label: BMG
- Songwriters: Andrew Tyler; Ásdís María Viðarsdóttir; Flo August; Sophie Alexandra Tweed-Simmons
- Producer: Christian Geller

No Angels singles chronology
"Still in Love with You" (2021)	"Mad Wild" (2021)	"When the Angels Sing" (2021)

"Mad Wild" is a song by all-female German pop band No Angels. It was written by Flo August, Andrew Tyler, Ásdís María Viðarsdóttir, and Sophie Alexandra Tweed-Simmons and recorded by the group for their sixth regular studio album 20 (2021), while production was helmed by Christian Geller. Supported by a remix version, the song was released as the album's third single on 6 August 2021, and reached number 67 on the German Download Chart.

== Background ==
Recorded by No Angels for their sixth regular studio album 20 (2021), "Mad Wild," co-written by American-Canadian singer Sophie Simmons and Icelandic singer Ásdís María Viðarsdóttir, is the only title that was chosen from a selection of around a dozen songs which their record company BMG had proposed for recording, being the favorite individual choice of every No Angels member. A song about a toxic relationship that always ends in bed instead of being ended for the better, it is built upon a bouncing synth bass and a 1980s-style snare sample, blending elements of funk and pop with contemporary R&B sounds. Benaissa described "Mad Wild" as a "modern, powerful [...] feel good track."

== Promotion ==
A lyric video for "Mad Wild" premiered online on 6 August 2021. Designed like an Instagram feed, it features behind the scenes footage as well as stills from the shootings for their music videos for "Daylight in Your Eyes (Celebration Version)" (2021) and Still in Love with You (Celebration Version)" (2021). In support of its single release, a radiomix of "Mad Wild," produced by Late9, was issued. The remix was released digitally by BMG Rights Management on 6 August 2021.

== Track listings ==
Digital single
No.	Title	Producer(s)	Length
1.	"Mad Wild" (Radiomix)	Christian Geller; Late9^{[a]}	2:30
2.	"Mad Wild" (Album Version)	Geller	2:35

Notes

- ^{^[a]} denotes additional producer

== Personnel and credits ==
Credits adapted from the liner notes of 20.

- Christoph Assmann – arranger, instruments
- Flo August – writer
- Nadja Benaissa – vocals
- Lucy Diakovska – vocals
- Christian Geller – arranger, instruments, producer
- Anya Mahnken – vocal arranger
- Sandy Mölling – vocals
- Andrew Tyler – writer
- Sophie Alexandra Tweed-Simmons – writer
- Ásdís María Viðarsdóttir – writer
- Jessica Wahls – vocals
- Dieter Wegner – mastering

== Charts ==
Chart performance for "Mad Wild"
Chart (2021)	Peak position
German Download (Official German Charts)	67

== Release history ==
Release dates and formats for "Mad Wild"
Region	Date	Format	Label	Edition(s)	Ref
Various	6 June 2021	Digital download; streaming	BMG	Album Version	
Various	6 August 2021	Digital download; streaming	BMG	Radiomix	
