= Still in Love with You (No Angels song) =

2002 single by No Angels

Single by No Angels

from the album Now... Us!
- Released: 12 August 2002
- Studio: Water-Edge-Studios (Munich)
- Length: 3:33 (album version)
- Label: Cheyenne; Poyldor
- Songwriters: Figge Boström; Johan Lindman
- Producers: Nick Nice; Pontus Söderqvist

No Angels singles chronology
"Something about Us" (2002)	"Still in Love with You" (2002)	"Let's Go to Bed" (2002)

"Still in Love with You" is a song performed by German group No Angels. Penned and composed by Figge Boström and Johan Lindman of Swedish songwriting collective La Carr, it was co-produced by Pontus Söderqvist and Nick Nice for the band's second studio album Now... Us! (2002). A mid-paced latin pop ballad, it showcases a more mature side from the band, with its instrumentation consisting essentially of flamenco guitars and bongo drums. Lyrically, the track finds the female protagonist thinking deeply over her relationship with her love interest from whom she parted; however, she still pines for him and feels self-conscious for doing so.

A slightly remixed version of the album version was released as Now... Us!'s second single through Cheyenne Records on August 12, 2002. Contemporary critics were generally positive with "Still in Love with You" who declared it brisk and dreamy. In 2003, the track was awarded the NRJ Music Award in the Best German Song category. The single proved to be commercially successful upon its release, charting at number two in Germany, continuing the band's string of top ten hits. "Still in Love with You" also reached number four in Austria and number ten on the Swiss Singles Chart while also entering the top forty of the airplay charts in Hungary.

An accompanying music video for "Still in Love with You" was directed by Marcus Sternberg and filmed near Almería in the south-eastern corner of Spain in early July 2002. It features each member of the band in different locations at the Mediterranean Sea as their perform the lines individually. The song was promoted through numerous live appearances, including performances on TV Total, VIVA Interaktiv and The Dome, and was performed on all of No Angels's subsequent concert tours. In 2021, to coincide with their twentieth anniversary, the remaining four members of No Angels re-recorded and filmed a second video for the Celebration Version of "Still in Love with You."

== Background ==
After a short break from public life at the turn of 2001, the members of No Angels reunited in February 2002 to begin working on their second album in Munich and Hamburg. Asked to contribute own ideas and skills to guarantee a more personal effort following the rushed recording of their debut album Elle'ments (2001), each member of the group focused on writing lyrics and melodies on her own — assisted by a wide range of different musicians and songwriters, including Thorsten Brötzmann, Alexander Geringas, Nik Hafemann, Thomas Anders and Christian Geller. "Still in Love with You" was written by Swedish musicians Figge Boström and Johan Lindman, while production was helmed by Nick Nice and Pontus Söderqvist for LaCarr. Recorded at The Orange Room at the LaCarr Studios in Stockholm, it was mixed by Nice and Peter "Boris" Boström. Instrumentation and programming were handled by Söderqvist and Nice, while guitars were led by Lindman. All vocals were recorded at the Water-Edge-Studios in Munich, Bavaria.

== Reception ==
Still in Love with You
A 22-second sample of the song, where No Angels sing over a "dreamy" instrumentation.

"Still in Love with You" received generally positive reviews from music critics. Abini Zöllner from Berliner Zeitung felt that the song was one of the best on Now... Us! and remarked that it was reminiscent of Chris Rea with its "dreamy guitar." Joachim Gauger from Laut.de declared the ballad as "quite brisk." In 2003, the track was awarded the French NRJ Music Award, created in 2000 by the radio station NRJ in partnership with the television network TF1, in the category Best German Song.

Johannes Cordes, former head of marketing at Polydor Records, first announced in the June edition of MusikWoche that "Still in Love with You" was expected to be released as the second single from Now... Us!. Eventually released on August 12, 2002, in Germany and Austria, the song managed to debut at number two on the German Singles Chart on August 23, 2002, being held off the top spot by Herbert Grönemeyer's hit single "Mensch." It managed to stay at number two the following week, but slipped to number three in its third week and eventually fell out of the top ten in early October 2002. It was ranked 25th on the German year-end singles chart. In Austria, "Still in Love with You" became No Angels' fifth top entry, debuting at number four. It managed to stay at same position another three weeks, before falling out of the top ten on October 6, 2002. Altogether, it spent 22 weeks on the chart, leaving the official top 75 in January 2003, and was later ranked 48th on the 2002 year-end chart in Austria.

== Music video ==
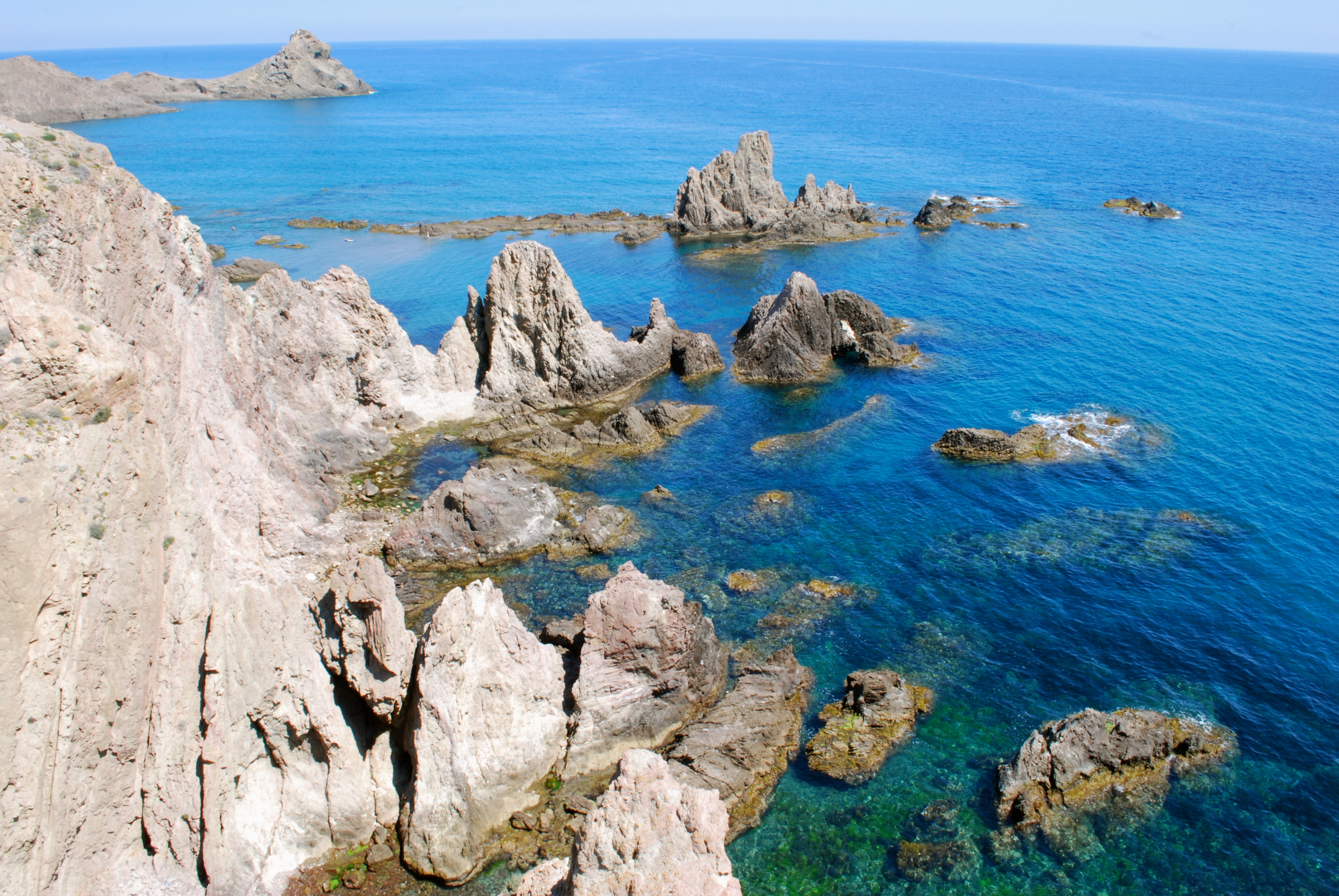
The music video was partly filmed in Arrecife de las Sirenas (pictured).

The accompanying music video for "Still in Love with You" was directed by Marcus Sternberg and filmed in the Cabo de Gata area near Almería, Andalusia in the south-eastern corner of Spain on July 4, 2002. It marked the band's second collaboration with Sternberg following their work on previous single "Something About Us". Shot in a time span of eighteen hours, sequences were primarily shot in and around a private villa, exclusively provided by its German owners.

In the video, the band members are shown in different locations. Benaissa is simply seen performing on the rooftop terrace of a finca where she gazes at the Mediterranean Sea. Mölling is walking along the rocky coast of Arrecife de las Sirenas, sitting down by the water. Wahls is sitting down by a swimming pool; on occasion she is seen belly dancing next to it. Diakovska's scenes were filmed atop a lighthouse where she is watching the sunrise. Petruo is sat on the steps in front of a church; at the end of the video she starts dancing flamenco at the setting of the sun. Their scenes are intercut with a male guitarist who is seated on a bench, playing on his acoustic guitar. Although it was already available for viewing at AOL, the video for "Still in Love with You" premiered on July 26, 2002, on MTV Central's Brand:Neu.

== Celebration Version ==
"Still in Love with You"

Single by No Angels

from the album 20
- Released: 4 June 2021
- Length: 3:38
- Label: BMG
- Songwriters: Figge Boström; Johan Lindman
- Producer: Christian Geller

No Angels singles chronology
"Daylight in Your Eyes" (2021)	"Still in Love with You" (2021)	"Mad Wild" (2021)

=== Background ===
In late 2020, BMG Rights Management acquired the catalog of No Angels' former record label Cheyenne Records, including more than 600 master recordings from bands and solo artists who had emerged from the German edition of the reality television program Popstars between 2000 and 2010. On 27 November 2020, following their absence from digital streaming platforms for five years, the band's backup catalog from 2000 to 2004 was issued online, accompanied by a digital campaign as well as the release of high-quality versions of their original official music videos. Released to strong streaming numbers, a revived interest from the media and their fan base prompted Benaissa, Diakovska, Mölling and Wahls to launch an official Instagram account through which they began sharing private photos and hosted several livestreams in the weeks following. As with their 2007 reformation, original member Vanessa Petruo rejected to join in for promotional activities, citing her wish to stay out of the public eye following a professional reorientation.

=== Release ===
While the quartet denied plans for a much-speculated reunion at first, on 12 February 2021, they released a celebration version of their 2001 debut single "Daylight in Your Eyes", featuring all-new vocals. Following their first live performance in a decade, the quartet signed a new recording deal with BMG and began work on 20, their first full-length album release since 2009, with plans to expand the anniversary celebrations. Produced by Christian Geller, chief producer on 20, the celebration version of "Still in Love with You" was recorded separately in Bulgaria, Germany, and United States due to the COVID-19 pandemic and Diakovska and Mölling living in Los Angeles and Pleven, respectively. Aside from the celebration version, Geller also produced an acoustic celebration version for 20 which features a slightly different instrumentation.

=== Chart performance ===
First released along with parent album 20 on 4 June 2021, the Celebration Version of "Still in Love with You" debuted and peaked at number 34 on the German Download Chart the same week.

=== Music video ===
A music video for the Celebration Version of "Still in Love with You" was directed by Franz Leibinger and filmed at the Mediterana day spa in Bergisch Gladbach on 21–22 May 2021. As with their previous clip for the Celebration Version of "Daylight in Your Eyes," the concept for the video was again pitched by creative team Army of Love Entertainment. Dancers Danilo Aiello, Christopher Albert, Marcella Desouza, Violetta Kromer, Lukas Bönninghausen, and Juan Lopez appear in the video. Costumes for the video were designed by Florian Parkitny. Post-production was helmed by Leibinger's Filmklub Entertainment. The video world premiered on 5 June 2021 on the pre-taped music show Schlagercountdown – So wird’s bald wieder sein, broadcast on Das Erste.

== Track listings ==
CD, maxi-single
No.	Title	Writer(s)	Producer(s)	Length
1.	"Still in Love with You" (Single Version)	Figge Boström; Johan Lindman	Nick Nice; Pontus Söderqvist	3:33
2.	"Still in Love with You" (Soulforce Latin Radio Mix)	Boström; Johan Lindman	Nice; Söderqvist; Michael Simon^{[a]}; Tissy Thiers^{[a]}; Mirko von Schlieffen^{[a]}	3:50
3.	"Still in Love with You" (Extended Version)	Boström; Johan Lindman	Nice; Söderqvist	8:12
4.	"Three Words"	Andreas Romdhane; Josef Larossi	Peter Ries	3:48

2-track single
No.	Title	Writer(s)	Producer(s)	Length
1.	"Still in Love with You" (Single Version)	Boström; Lindman	Nice; Söderqvist	3:33
2.	"Three Words"	Romdhane; Larossi	Ries	3:48

Notes

- ^{^a} denotes additional producer

== Credits and personnel ==
Credits adapted from the liner notes of Now... Us!.

- Production – Pontus Söderqvist, Nick Nice
- Instruments – Söderqvist, Nice
- Programming – Söderqvist, N. Nice
- Guitars – Johan Lindman, Pontus Söderqvist
- Mixing – Mike "Spike" Streefkerk
- Supervising producer – Nik Hafemann
- Recorded at Water-Edge-Studios (Munich, Bavaria)

== Charts ==
=== Weekly charts ===
Weekly chart performance for "Still in Love with You"
Chart (2002)	Peak position
Austria (Ö3 Austria Top 40)	4
Europe (Eurochart Hot 100)	11
Germany (GfK)	2
Germany Airplay (BVMI)	3
Hungary (Rádiós Top 40)	39
Poland Airplay (Music & Media)	10
Poland (Polish Airplay Charts)	5
Switzerland (Schweizer Hitparade)	10

=== Year-end charts ===
Year-end chart performance for "Still in Love with You"
Chart (2002)	Position
Austria (Ö3 Austria Top 40)	48
Germany (Media Control)	25
Switzerland (Schweizer Hitparade)	73

== Release history ==
Release dates and formats for "Still in Love with You"
Region	Date	Format	Label	Edition(s)	Ref
Various	24 June 2002	Album; digital download	Poyldor; Zeitgeist; Cheyenne	Album Version	
Austria	12 August 2002	CD single; digital single	Poyldor; Zeitgeist; Cheyenne	Single Version	
Germany	12 August 2002	CD single; digital single	Poyldor; Zeitgeist; Cheyenne	Single Version	
Switzerland	2 September 2002	CD single; digital single	Poyldor; Zeitgeist; Cheyenne	Single Version	
Various	6 June 2021	Digital download; streaming	BMG	Celebration Version	
