= Something About Us (No Angels song) =

Single by No Angels

from the album Now... Us!
- Released: 6 May 2002
- Studio: Park (Tutzing, Lake Starnberg)
- Length: 3:25
- Label: Cheyenne; Polydor
- Songwriters: Vanessa Petruo; Thorsten Brötzmann; Alexander Geringas
- Producer: Brötzmann

No Angels singles chronology
"Atlantis" / "When the Angels Sing" (2001)	"Something About Us" (2002)	"Still in Love with You" (2002)

Audio sample
- file; help

"Something About Us" is a song by German female pop band No Angels. It was chiefly written by band member Vanessa Petruo along with frequent collaborator Thorsten Brötzmann and Alexander Geringas for the group's second studio album Now... Us! (2002), and created as a response to what the band felt was intense and sometimes unfair and inaccurate media criticism at the time, predominantly resulting from the clichés and prejudices generally associated with their manufactured band image. Produced by Brötzmann and co-producer Jeo, the uptempo track incorporates elements of both the contemporary R&B and dance-pop genre as well as Latin-pop and church music during the bridge.

Released as the album's leading single on 6 May 2002 in German-speaking Europe, the record achieved major success by becoming the group's third non-consecutive number-one hit in Austria and Germany within a period of fifteen months. In addition, it reached number three on Eurochart Hot 100 Singles chart and number eleven in Switzerland, eventually going platinum. The record was generally well received by contemporary critics, who acclaimed the band for the production and inclusion of self-written material, and was nominated for both a 2002 Top of the Pops Awards and the 2003 ECHO Award for Best National Single — Rock/Pop.

The music video for the song was directed by Marcus Sternberg, and won the 2003 ECHO Award in the category Videoclip National. Inspired by the media-critical subtext of the lyrics, the clip features the quintet as printers of the fictional tabloid newspaper called Daily Express, each of them facing rumored page-one catchlines such as alleged bisexuality, incest, and physical aggression. "Something About Us" was performed on several television and award show ceremonies, such as Die Harald Schmidt Show, The Dome and the 11th ECHO Awards.

== Background and release ==
"Something About Us" is one out of five self-penned contributions to the Now... Us! album. Vanessa Petruo, songwriter Alexander Geringas, and producer Brötzmann worked on the track during the album's finishing process in the Park Studios in Tutzing, Bavaria. Incorporating autobiographical features, it was inspired by Petruo's experiences with the media the year before. "I recalled the past year, the good and the bad times, and I built my own personal résumé," she said about the song's writing process the following year. "I was thinking about the people who never have believed in us and just don't accept that we are true musicians und see ourselves as artists [...] I just wanted to say: I see those prejudices and sometimes they hurt but generally we're laughing [them away]. That's the essence of the song!"

While the band regarded the song an early candidate to become the album's lead single in hopes of breaking away from the stereotyping Europop widely associated with the group through previous singles, the group's record company Cheyenne Records declared the song too risky for the charts. Instead the label originally intended album cut "2 Get Over U", a duet with UK popstars Hear'Say, as the band's next single with a release around Christmas 2001. However, due to Hear'Say's limited fame in Germany Polydor Records and Cheyenne decided to exclude the band's vocals from the song and moved it back to a spring 2002 launch to enable No Angels additional work on their second longplayer. Although No Angels premiered the song on The Dome 21 in Stuttgart on 1 March 2002 and a release date was set on 18 March 2002, "2 Get Over You" was eventually shelved in favour of the self-written "Something About Us".

== Release and reception ==
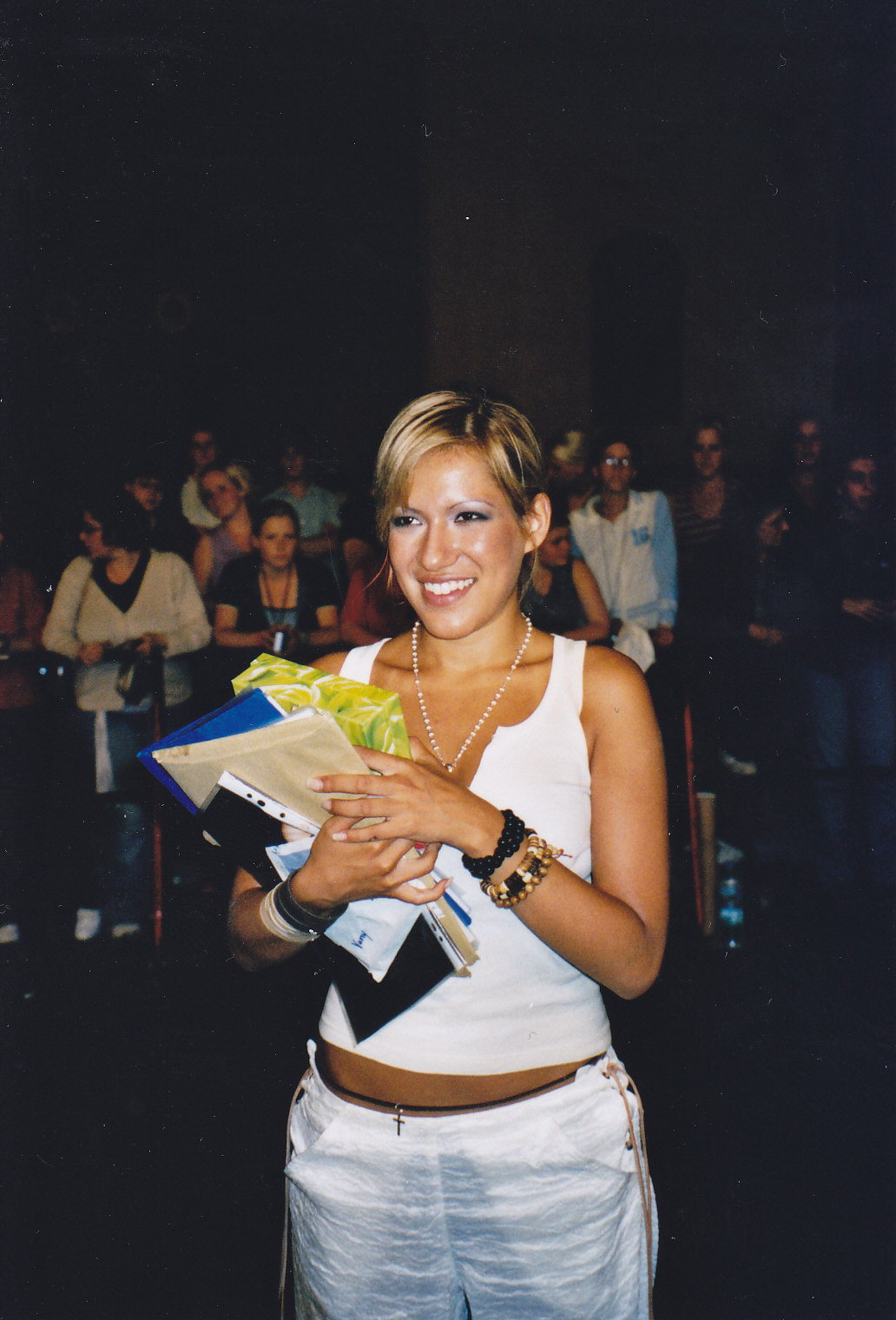
"Something About Us" was written by band member Vanessa Petruo (pictured).

"Something About Us" was premiered on The Dome 21 in Stuttgart on 1 March, and made its television debut on 7 March 2002 at the 11th ECHO Awards in Berlin. Officially released on 6 May 2002, the CD maxi single spawned extended and club mixes as well as an alternative Latin Radio Edit, all produced by Das Leihaus and the latter of also appeared on the Special Winter Edition of the album, and the Langnese jingle "Like Ice in the Sunshine".

Upon its release on 6 May 2002, "Something About Us" became the band's third single to debut on the top position of the German Singles Chart, as well as the group's third non-consecutive number-one hit within a period of sixteen months. It remained on top of the chart for four consecutive weeks, seven weeks in the top ten, and sixteen weeks inside the top 100, making its last appearance on the chart one week prior to the entry of follow-up single "Still in Love with You". It received a platinum certification by the German arm of the International Federation of the Phonographic Industry. However, the song but failed to reach the top ten of the biggest-selling singles of the year and was eventually ranked eleventh on the German year-end chart.

The song also became the band's third number-one hit in Austria, where it debuted at number four on the Austrian Singles Chart on 19 May 2002, before climbing to number one the next week. It spent one week on top of the singles charts only, but remained six weeks inside the Top 10 and twenty-one weeks in total. It received a gold certification by the IFPI Austria and was ranked within the thirty biggest-selling singles of 2002. In Switzerland, "Something About Us" underperformed in its first week, debuting at number thirty-one on the Swiss Singles Chart only. The following week, it jumped to number eleven due to a major increase in sales and radio support, but it would become the band's first single not to reach the Top 10.

== Music video ==
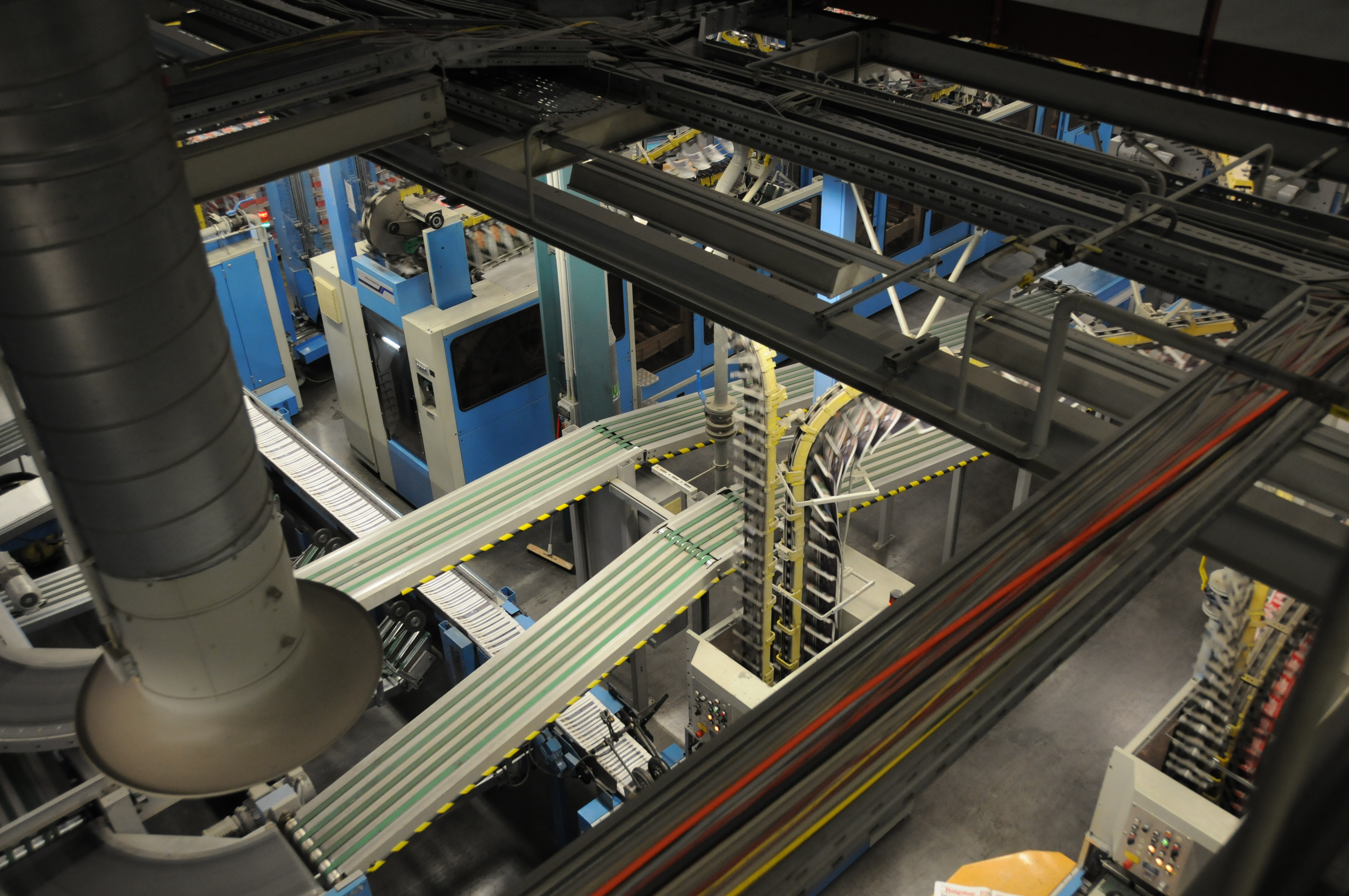
A Berlin printing plant was selected as the video's venue (pictured).

An accompanying music video was filmed at the former G+J Berlin Zeitungssdruck printing plant in early April 2002. It marked No Angels' first collaboration with German director Marcus Sternberg who would become a frequent collaborator on subsequent visuals. Production was handled by Bigfish Filmproduktion. Filming took twenty hours. Canadian choreographer Sean Cheesman was consulted to oversee the shooting. Sascha Dickreuter, then spouse of band member Jessica Wahls, appears as her backing dancer in the video. At the 2003 ECHO Awards, "Something About Us" won in the Videoclip National category.

Inspired by its media-critical lyrical subtext, the clip for "Something About Us" features the quintet as overall-dressed printers who work for an all-fictional tabloid newspaper called Daily Express. While they are seen dancing in front of running printing presses throughout most of the video, intercut with face shots and some male dancers, close shots of the paper's pages reveal the background of the page-one catchline "Girlband Shocker": Each of them has to deal with intense media scrutiny, including rumors of alleged bisexuality, incest, depression, and physical aggression, among others. Although slightly autobiographical, Lucy Diakovska has denied that the headlines were inspired by real-life events. When asked about the substance of the visuals, Jessica Wahls elaborated that "the video is not about certain event [...] but [it is] about how we've felt the past year, [about] what happened to [each of] us and the band."

== Track listings ==
CD maxi single
No.	Title	Writer(s)	Producer(s)	Length
1.	"Something About Us" (Latin Radio Edit)	Vanessa Petruo; Thorsten Brötzmann; Alexander Geringas	Brötzmann; Jeo^{[a]}; Das Leihaus^{[b]}	3:05
2.	"Something About Us" (R&B Single Edit)	Petruo; Brötzmann; Geringas	Brötzmann; Jeo^{[a]}	3:25
3.	"Something About Us" (Club Radio Edit)	Petruo; Brötzmann; Geringas	Brötzmann; Jeo^{[a]}; Das Leihaus^{[b]}	3:28
4.	"Something About Us" (Extended Edit)	Petruo; Brötzmann; Geringas	Brötzmann; Jeo^{[a]}	4:50
5.	"Like Ice in the Sunshine"	Holger Kopp	Nik Hafemann; Syndicate Music	3:00

2-track CD single
No.	Title	Writer(s)	Producer(s)	Length
1.	"Something About Us" (Latin Radio Edit)	Petruo; Brötzmann; Geringas	Brötzmann; Jeo^{[a]}; Das Leihaus^{[b]}	3:05
2.	"Like Ice in the Sunshine"	Kopp	Hafemann; Syndicate Music	3:00

Notes

- ^{^a} denotes co-producer
- ^{^b} denotes additional producer

== Credits and personnel ==
Credits taken from Now... Us! liner notes.

- Nadja Benaissa – vocals
- Thorsten Brötzmann – keyboards, producer, writer
- Alexander Geringas – writer
- Lucy Diakovska – vocals
- Joachim "Jeo" Mezei – co-producer, keyboards, mixing

- Sandy Mölling – vocals
- Vanessa Petruo – vocals, writer
- Jessica Wahls – vocals
- Peter Weihe – guitar

== Charts ==
=== Weekly charts ===
Weekly chart performance for "Something About Us"
Chart (2002)	Peak position
Austria (Ö3 Austria Top 40)	1
Czech Republic (IFPI)	23
Europe (Eurochart Hot 100)	6
Germany (GfK)	1
Hungary (Rádiós Top 40)	32
Switzerland (Schweizer Hitparade)	11

=== Year-end charts ===
Year-end chart performance for "Something About Us"
Chart (2002)	Position
Austria (Ö3 Austria Top 40)	29
Germany (GfK)	11
Switzerland (Schweizer Hitparade)	63

== Certifications ==
Certifications for "Something About Us"
Region	Certification	Certified units/sales
Austria (IFPI Austria)	Gold	15,000^{*}
Germany (BVMI)	Platinum	500,000^{^}
^{*} Sales figures based on certification alone.^{^} Shipments figures based on certification alone.

== See also ==
- List of number-one hits of 2002 (Austria)
- List of number-one hits of 2002 (Germany)
