= MusikWoche =

German music magazine

The MusikWoche is a German music professional magazine. In its subtitle, it calls itself "The news magazine for the music industry". It is thus a trade magazine for the music industry in German-speaking countries. Since 2014, it has been published by Busch Entertainment Media, today under the name Busch & Glatz.

== Target group ==
The magazine is aimed at buyers in sound carrier wholesale and retail, media partners in the press, TV, online and radio sectors, music publishers, music professionals in the music production sector, concert agencies and all others working in the music industry.

== Contents ==
Formerly on (mostly) 56, now on (circa) 40 pages, each issue is dedicated to current topics in the music and live entertainment industry. Trend analysis, interviews, background information, topic specials, trade focuses, market statistics, company portraits, live happenings, programme planners, address or contact overviews and a detailed record chart are among the regular contents.

== History ==
In mid-March 1993, Munich publisher Ulrich Scheele planned to launch another magazine for the entertainment media industry in 1981 founded publishing house Entertainment Media another magazine for the entertainment media industry. He spoke to Stuttgart based music journalism Manfred Gillig-Degrave, who has worked successfully at various Hifi magazines such as Audio, but had just suffered shipwreck with the music magazine Zounds, on how to proceed. The Popkomm held in August seemed suitable as a showcase forum and its opening date was therefore targeted as the completion date. On 5 July 1993 the zero issue was available and the marketing campaign began. The campaign officially began on 9 August with issue 32/1993. In the following issues, starting with news from Austria and Switzerland, the service was expanded bit by bit. In 1994, topic specials were published for the first time independent scene, multimedia law, radio landscape, Folk music. Furthermore, bi-weekly jazz charts were introduced and the first "Who-is-Who" poster with the contact details of label staff was included.

Editor-in-Chief was Gillig-Degrave from July 1993 to July 2000. He then moved to Hannibal-Verlag, which specialised in music books, but returned to MusikWoche with effect from 1 January 2002. Since July 2015, he has acted as editor. Norbert Schiegl and Knut Schlinger took his place. In 2000/2001, Christian Stolberg (previously WOM Magazin, afterwards Musikexpress) replaced Gillig-Degrave as editor-in-chief.

In 2007, the publishing house Gruner + Jahr acquired the entertainment media publications from Scheele and the Ebner publishing group, which now held a share of around 83 percent. In 2014, after rethinking the strategic direction of the large Hamburg-based company, they were up for sale again. The newly founded Cologne-based company Busch Business Media seized the opportunity and has since distributed them together with the magazine range around MusikWoche and Blickpunkt:Film. However, the editorial office was only marginally relocated from Aschheim near Munich to the Bavarian capital. According to estimates by market experts, the revenue for Gruner + Jahr was in the "higher single-digit" million range.

== Proper spelling and mode of publication ==
The proper spelling varies from time to time. Initially "MUSIKWoche" was used, most recently "musik.woche". Quotations are usually given as "MusikWoche".

The weekly magazine is only available by subscription. It is dated on the Monday of the respective calendar week. A double issue is published at the turn of the year.
