= Ice in the Sunshine =

Single by Beagle Music Ltd.
- B-side: "Thin Ice"
- Released: 1985
- Recorded: 1985
- Genre: Dance-pop
- Length: 3:01
- Label: RCA
- Songwriter(s): Holger Julian Copp, Hanno Harders
- Producer(s): Beagle Music Ltd.

Beagle Music Ltd. singles chronology
"Ice in the Sunshine" (1985)	"Daydream" (1986)

"Ice in the Sunshine" is a song by German pop group Beagle Music Ltd. Initially composed and recorded as a jingle for a 1985 Langnese ice-cream cinema commercial, it gained massive popularity after its screenings and was subsequently released as a single in Germany in 1986, reaching the top ten. Lead vocals of the original jingle were done by Ian Cussick. The recordings for the single release feature a different singer.

In the 2000s, the song was revitalized when America singer Anastacia re-recorded the track for another Langnese commercial. It has since been covered by several artists for promotion, including No Angels, DJ Tomekk, Shaggy and The Bosshoss.

== Track listings ==
7" single

1. "Ice in the Sunshine" — 3:01
2. "Thin Ice" — 2:10

== Charts ==
Chart (1986)	Peak position
West Germany (GfK)	10
