= Alex Geringas =

German musical artist (born 1971)

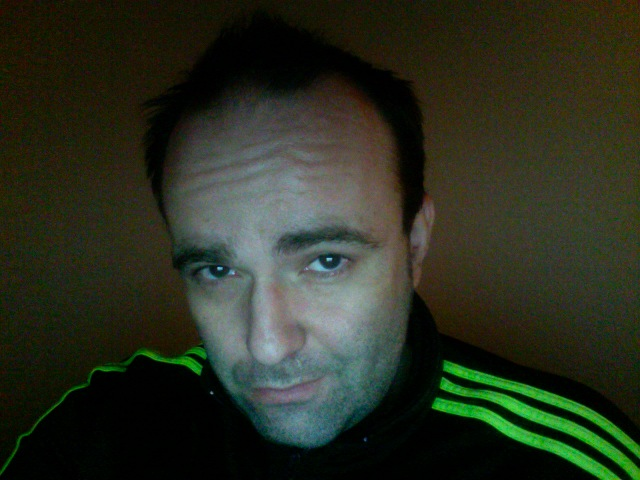
- Geringas in 2009

Background information
- Born: March 2, 1971 (age 55); Moscow, Soviet Union
- Occupations: composer, songwriter, producer
- Years active: 1998–present
- Spouse: Katharina Geringas (m. 2004)

Alex Geringas (born March 2, 1971) is a German composer and songwriter based in Los Angeles, United States.

== Awards ==
- 1998 Echo Award – Best Newcomer – Die 3. Generation
- 2003 Echo Award – Best Video – No Angels "Something about us"
- 2013 BMI London Award – Kelly Clarkson "Dark Side"
- 2013 Grammy Award – "Best Pop Vocal Album", Kelly Clarkson (contains "Dark Side")
- 2014 BMI Pop Award – Kelly Clarkson "Dark Side"
- 2015 Emmy Nomination – Original Theme "Who's da King" / All Hail King Julien
- 2017 Annie Nomination – Outstanding Achievement in Music for an animated TV Show for "Home : Adventures with Tip and Oh"
