= TwentyFive Live 2026 =

2025 concert tour by No Angels

- Tour by No Angels
- Promotional poster for the tour
- Location: Germany
- Start date: 13 June 2026
- End date: 5 September 2026
- No. of shows: 11

No Angels concert chronology
- Still in Love with You – Summer 2025 (2025); TwentyFive Live 2026 (2026)

TwentyFive Live 2026 is a festival tour by German pop band No Angels, launched in support of their 25th anniversary. Serving as a continuation of their Still in Love with You – Summer 2025 festival tour, it consisted of 11 scheduled festival appearances. The tour began on 13 June 2026 at the Happy Life Festival in Nuremberg after the first three scheduled dates were cancelled for health-related reasons and concluded on 5 September 2026 at the Glücksgefühle Festival in Hockenheim.

The setlists drew primarily from the band's Still in Love with You – Summer 2025 festival tour, while incorporating new elements and a revised song selection. TwentyFive Live 2026 received positive reviews for the band's energetic performances, strong vocals, choreography, and nostalgic appeal. Their 5 September appearance at the Glücksgefühle Festival also attracted widespread media attention after the group made a political statement in support of diversity and freedom of expression.

== Background ==
Following their reunion in 2021 and the release of 20, their first full-length studio album since 2009, No Angels launched their Celebration Tour in June 2022. Resuming in September 2022, the tour comprised ten concerts across Germany and concluded on 8 October 2022, bringing the group's anniversary celebrations to a close. Although the band's future as a recording act initially remained uncertain, they returned to the studio in 2024 to record a new album, It's Christmas. This was followed by Still in Love with You – Summer 2025, a festival tour celebrating their 25th anniversary, which largely drew from the setlists of the Celebration Tour and comprised eleven concerts between 7 June and 10 October 2025, including No Angels' first live performances in Austria and Switzerland in decades.

A continuation of Still in Love with You – Summer 2025, called TwentyFive Live 2026, was announced on 29 October 2025, initially comprising nine scheduled performances. Additional dates were subsequently confirmed over the following months, including shows in Nuremberg, Mainz, Tuttlingen, and Zwickau, as well as an appearance at the Deichbrand Festival in Cuxhaven, among other engagements. The initial preparatory phase was subsequently postponed after the first three scheduled concert dates in Merkers, Landsweiler-Reden and Hilchenbach had to be cancelled due to health-related reasons affecting band member Sandy Mölling, resulting in a rescheduling of the tour commencement to June 2026. The band ultimately convened during the first week of June at Studio 61 Recording Studios in Kruft, operated by their producer and manager Christian Geller, in order to develop a revised setlist.

== Critical reception ==
From left: Mölling, Wahls, Benaissa, and Diakovska performing "Let's Go to Bed" at their 2 July concert in Porta Westfalica.

The tour received generally positive reviews from German media, with critics highlighting the group's energetic performances, vocal delivery, choreography, and nostalgic appeal. Reviewing the group's 13 June 2026 performance in Nuremberg, the online edition of the Nürnberger Nachrichten wrote: "No Angels were the acclaimed headlining act at the inaugural Happy Life Festival at Nuremberg Airport. They did not disappoint their fans, delivering an energetic performance." Writing for the Allgemeine Zeitung, Elena Joser similarly commended the group's 18 June 2026 concert in Mainz, stating that No Angels had "thoroughly delighted fans" at the Mainz Citadel and taken the audience on "a captivating journey through their career." Matthes Köppinghoff of Norddeutscher Rundfunk praised No Angels' performance at Deichbrand Festival as an energetic and crowd-pleasing set, noting that the group's early afternoon appearance drew a packed audience eager to celebrate their legacy. He described their appearance as a highlight that set a high standard for the rest of the festival. Similarly, Rolling Stone's Kristina Baum highlighted No Angels' concert as a standout nostalgic moment, noting that the group drew a large crowd to the stage with a performance that created an early festival highlight.

In her review of the 31 July concert in Salzkotten, Westfalen-Blatt editor Lorena Brüseke noted that the four band members had retained their appeal, impressing the audience with "impressive choreography, strong vocal performances and plenty of energy." She also highlighted their coordinated white-and-silver outfits, which complemented the medieval castle setting. Henrike Raestrup of Der Patriot noted that the combination of the No Angels' "legendary 2000s girl-group anthems" and Max Giesinger's subsequent radio pop made the same concert a "cross-generational experience" that was likely to remain memorable for the audience. Niklas Schrimpf from Schwäbische Post described the 1 August 2026 concert in Bopfingen as an energetic "girl power" show. He noted that songs such as "Welcome to the Dance" and "Let's Go to Bed" echoed from the old city wall and characterized the atmosphere as an "exhilarating journey through time." Nancy Heusel, writing for Hannoversche Allgemeine Zeitung, praised the band at their Hannover show on 4 September 2026 for dispensing with "over-the-top staging and frills" in favor of energy, strong lyrics, and "generational nostalgia," while noting the four members' harmonious performance. No Angels' appearance at the Glücksgefühle Festival on 5 September 2026, their final major open-air concert of the summer, received widespread media coverage after the group appeared on stage wearing shirts reading "FCK AFD" in support of diversity, equality, and freedom of expression and in opposition to the far-right party AfD. This followed the festival organizers disinviting band Alphaville after its singer Marian Gold had sought to speak out against right-wing extremism.

== Set list ==
1. "Welcome to the Dance" (Intro)
2. "Rivers of Joy" (contains elements of "We Found Love")
3. "Let's Go to Bed" (contains elements of "You Could Be the First")
4. "No Angel (It's All in Your Mind)"
5. "All Cried Out"
6. "Goodbye to Yesterday"
7. "Down Boy"
8. "Three Words"
9. "Send Me Flowers"
10. "Someday"
11. "Still in Love with You"
12. "Too Old"
13. "Make a Change"
14. "100% Emotional"
15. "So What"
16. "Lost in You"
17. "Mad Wild"
18. "A New Day"
19. "Cold as Ice"
20. "Feelgood Lies"
21. "One Life"
22. "There Must Be an Angel"
23. "Something About Us"
24. "Daylight in Your Eyes" (contains elements of "Sandstorm")

== Tour dates ==
List of concerts with date, city, country, and venue
Date	City	Venue	Attendance
13 June 2026	Nuremberg	Happy Life Festival	Unknown
18 June 2026	Mainz	Citadel	2,000
19 June 2025	Brandenburg an der Havel	Havelfest	5,000
27 June 2026	Cologne	Rainbow Festival	Unknown
28 June 2026	Burglengenfeld	Steinbruch Open Air	Unknown
2 July 2026	Porta Westfalica	Bergwerk Festival	Unknown
17 July 2026	Cuxhaven	Deichbrand Festival	60,000
31 July 2026	Salzkotten	Dreckburg Open Air	5,000
1 August 2026	Bopfingen	Summer Vibes Open Air	1,500
4 September 2026	Hannover	Gilde Parkbühne	1,300
5 September 2026	Hockenheim	Glücksgefühle Festival	Unknown

== Cancelled shows ==
On 6 May 2026, ahead of the start of the tour, the band announced on Instagram that the first three scheduled concerts in Merkers, Landsweiler-Reden and Hilchenbach would be cancelled, citing health-related reasons concerning Sandy Mölling. On 16 May 2026, the band announced that three additional planned concerts in Zwickau, Eisenhüttenstadt, and Friedrichshafen had also been cancelled, this time citing "production-related reasons."

List of cancelled concerts
Date	City	Venue
9 May 2026	Merkers	Erlebnis Bergwerk
22 May 2026	Landsweiler-Reden	Back for Good Festival
24 May 2026	Hilchenbach	KulturPur Festival
4 July 2026	Zwickau	Freilichtbühne Zwickau
18 July 2026	Eisenhüttenstadt	Freilichtbühne
2 August 2026	Friedrichshafen	Graf-Zeppelin-Haus
