= OVB =

OVB may refer to:

- OVB, the IATA code for Tolmachevo Airport, Novosibirsk, Russia
- Omitted-variable bias
- Otto von Bismarck
- Oberbayerisches Volksblatt, German regional newspaper
