= It's Christmas (No Angels album) =

Studio album by No Angels
- Released: 21 November 2025
- Length: 53:13
- Label: Stars by Edel
- Producer: Christian Geller

No Angels chronology
20 (2021)	It's Christmas (2025)

Singles from It's Christmas
- 1. "I Still Believe" Released: 10 October 2025; 2. "Santa Claus Is Comin' to Town" Released: 7 November 2025

It's Christmas is the seventh studio album by all-female German pop group No Angels. It was released by Stars by Edel on 21 November 2025 in German-speaking Europe. A follow-up to their 2021 anniversary album 20, It's Christmas marked the band's first Christmas album. Drawing on the big band style of their 2002 release When the Angels Swing, it was recorded with a full symphony orchestra under the direction of Bulgarian arranger and conductor George Miltiyadoff, with 20 producer Christian Geller returning as the album's main producer. It's Christmas consists of fifteen tracks, featuring eleven cover versions of Christmas standards and carols and four original songs, including two versions of "I Still Believe".

The album earned generally positive reviews, with most critics praising It's Christmas's polished, festive production and its continuity with the bands's established pop style, while others argued that it lacked character. After its release, the album opened at number ten on the German Albums Chart, becoming the band's eighth top ten album in Germany. It's Christmas was preceded by the singles "I Still Believe" and "Santa Claus Is Comin' to Town", the former of which also served as the theme song for the 30th RTL-Spendenmarathon. In further promotion of the project, the band is set to promote the album during an exclusive performance on 18 December 2026 at Berlin's Uber Eats Music Hall.

== Background ==
In January 2021, after more than ten years without performing together, former No Angels members Nadja Benaissa, Lucy Diakovska, Sandy Mölling and Jessica Wahls reunited as a group to release a new version of their debut single "Daylight in Your Eyes" to commemorate with the 2001 release of the song, followed by 20, their first full-length album release since 2009, with plans to expand the anniversary celebrations. Released to strong streaming numbers and a revived interest from the media and their fan base, the album debuted at number one on the German Albums Chart, becoming No Angels' first chart topper in nearly two decades, and reached the top ten in Austria and Switzerland. In June 2022, the band kicked off their Celebration Tour at the Parkbühne Wuhlheide. Continued in September 2022, the concert tour compromised ten concerts throughout Germany and concluded on 8 October 2022. Initially uncertain about their future as a recording group, the band assured they would keep performing together and in 2023, No Angels reunited for several festival concerts and one-off events.

== Recording ==
In January 2024, after winning the 17th season of the reality show Ich bin ein Star – Holt mich hier raus!, Diakovska disclosed that the quartet was planning to record new material for an upcoming project in Berlin during the summer of 2024. In July 2024, she and Mölling independently confirmed that the project would be a new studio album, contradicting earlier statements in which the band had expressed that they could not envision recording new music beyond the release of 20, although Mölling declined to speculate on when the project might be released. In the week of 30 July 2024, the group reunited at the Studio 61 recording studios of their producer and manager Christian Geller in Kruft to record their vocals, test video recordings, and discuss strategic matters related to the album. The sessions marked the first time the quartet recorded vocals together since the production of their fifth studio album Welcome to the Dance (2009), as large portions of 20 had been recorded separately due to restrictions imposed during the COVID-19 pandemic. The recording process was completed on 18 August 2024, as announced by the group via Instagram.

While the vocals were recorded in Germany, a substantial portion of the music was composed and recorded in Bulgaria, Diakovska's native country. Aspiring to make another artistic leap, the band enlisted conductor George Miltiyadoff, a friend and frequent collaborator of Diakovska, to handle the album's arrangements and pre-production. Drawing on the big band style of No Angels' 2002 release When the Angels Swing, he was responsible for all symphonic and big band arrangements on It's Christmas. Miltiyadoff regarded his work on the album as a "great honor" and a "long journey, both professionally and emotionally, with every note, line, and idea conceived from a desire to create something genuine, distinctive, warm, and imbued with the light of Christmas." His music was recorded with a full-size big band at Doli Media Studio and Max Sound Studio in Sofia. Discussing the album’s sound in an interview with SWR1, Mölling explained that the idea for a Christmas album had been on the group's mind "for a long time", but that they wanted to create something "special and timeless [...] with classics, but also with a few new songs and presented in a unique musical setting." She added that it was important to the band to convey a message with the album and that they took considerable time to record the material.

== Artwork and visuals ==
All visual material for It's Christmas was produced during the week of 11 August 2025, coinciding with the band's Still in Love with You – Summer 2025 festival tour. For the production, the band returned to Geller's Studio 61 in Kruft, where they spent three days recording interview segments, creating 24 individual clips for a social media Advent calendar and conducting a photo shoot for the album's promotional artwork. In addition, five videos were filmed during the same session, including official music videos for "I Still Believe", "Santa Claus Is Comin' to Town" and "It's Christmas" as well as two promotional clips for "Mary's Little Baby" and "Santa Baby". Direction and photography for the entire project were handled by Marcel Brell.

== Promotion ==
=== Singles ===
With their 25th anniversary approaching, the group revealed in October 2024 that the album's release was postponed beyond 2024 and would instead be preceded by Still in Love with You – Summer 2025, a festival tour in the summer of 2025. On October 3, 2025, No Angels announced via Instagram that their upcoming single "I Still Believe" was set for release on October 10. The band's first release in four years, the song was made available for pre-order across all platforms later that same day. On October 10, German television channel RTL announced that the song was also serving as the theme for the 30th RTL-Spendenmarathon, an annual fundraising event organized by RTL's Wir helfen Kindern foundation since 1996. A music video for the song, directed by Marcel Brell, was premiered on 13 October 2025. On 3 November 2025, the band revealed that "Santa Claus Is Comin' to Town" would serve as the album's second single. An accompanying video, also directed by Brell, was released on November 7. On 23 November 2025, coinciding with the It's Christmas release event in Cologne, the music video for album's title track, again directed by Brell, was released.

=== Performances ===
No Angels gave the debut performance of "I Still Believe" on the television program Schlagerboom, hosted by singer Florian Silbereisen. The show was recorded on 17 October 2025 at the Westfalenhalle in Dortmund and broadcast the following evening in prime time on German public broadcaster Das Erste. The band performed the song a second time on television during the finale of the RTL-Spendenmarathon on 21 November 2025. On 23 November 2025, the band celebrated the release of It's Christmas with a dedicated release event at the Cinedom in Cologne, featuring an album listening session, a live set, and live talks. On 29 November 2025, the band appeared on the live show Das Adventsfest der 100.000 Lichter, where they performed "Santa Claus Is Comin' to Town" as well as a German-language version of "Hark! The Herald Angels Sing" for the first time. On December 4, the band performed at the ZDF charity gala Die große Weihnachtsshow in Offenburg. Together with host Giovanni Zarrella, they sang "It’s the Most Wonderful Time of the Year" and concluded the show with a performance of "It's Christmas". The band is expected to present It's Christmas at an exclusive concert on 18 December 2026 at the Uber Eats Music Hall in Berlin.

== Critical reception ==
Professional ratings
Review scores
Source	Rating
laut.de	2/5 stars
Maxazine	7/10
mix1.de	7/8
Oberbayerisches Volksblatt	3/5 stars
Plattentests	3/10

German online music magazine Mix1.de rated the album 7/8 and wrote: "No Angels impressively prove that even after a quarter of a century, they still belong together—and sound as if they had never been away. It's Christmas is more than just another Christmas album. It is a musical thank-you to the fans who have remained loyal to the band for 25 years. Between atmospheric ballads and danceable holiday anthems, the quartet shows that they have mastered the balance between nostalgia and contemporary flair". Tobias Brown, writing for Maxazine, remarked that the band was "opting for a classic, warm sound" on It's Christmas. He further noted: "The orchestral arrangement lends the tracks a full, festive atmosphere without becoming excessive. Lyrically, the album balances reflection and light-hearted joy, suiting the mix of maturity and youthful energy in the band members' voices. Although aimed primarily at the holiday season, the sound remains rooted in No Angels’ pop identity: this is not a detached Christmas release but a logical continuation of their earlier work, now dressed in festive colours. It is not a radically innovative project, but it exudes sincerity and genuinely feels like an ode to Christmas". Kronen Zeitung's Nadi Adana described the album as "jazzy big band meets modern pop arrangements, somewhere between Broadway and a winter wonderland".

SR3 observed that although recording a Christmas album was "not innovative," It's Christmas was executed "really well." The radio station's editorial team described the album as "opulent, polished, and technically accomplished," with its lush sound and festive sparkle created through the collaboration with a big band and orchestra and the "ceremonial," celebratory staging of the live recordings. The Oberbayerisches Volksblatt rated It's Christmas three out of five stars and called it a "festively sparkling album. Lucy, Sandy, Nadja and Jessica present the expected classics in big-band style, from Frank Sinatra's "Have Yourself a Merry Little Christmas" to the pleasantly swinging "It's the Most Wonderful Time of the Year" by crooner Andy Williams. The singing is clean and polished [...] There are no surprises. Anyone looking for a nice Christmas soundtrack that won't bother anyone is welcome to listen." Plattentests critic Eric Meyer described the album as "opulent and spruced up. The pieces move stylistically — smoothly polished but skillfully crafted — between gospel-like chansons, jazzy approaches, and lightly danceable swing-pop. On top of that, there are repeatedly overblown arrangements, smothered in strings. So, basically, the typical sound backdrop for festive knick-knack". Janne Stoltze from laut.de rated the two out of five stars. She found that the album lacked character, writing: "No Angels contribute their part to the already oversaturated sea of Christmas albums and songs, but they don't stand out. Neither through their choice of songs nor through the sonic production. Christmas songs can certainly be influenced by modern pop elements [but] anyone who produces a Christmas album with songs that have already been covered hundreds of times, and fails to add even a spark of their own character, might as well not have bothered".

== Commercial performance ==
Released on 21 November 2025, It's Christmas opened and peaked at number ten on the German Albums Chart. It became the group's sixth regular studio album and their eighth overall release to reach the top ten in Germany, including 2002's swing cover album When the Angels Swing (2002) and the 2003 compilation album The Best of No Angels. Prior to its official chart entry, the album had appeared at number seven on the chart's midweek ranking. In addition, It's Christmas reached number five on the German Pop Albums chart. In Austria, the album debuted at number 26 on the Austrian Albums Chart in the week of 28 November, marking No Angels' seventh non-consecutive top 30 entry in that market.

== Track listing ==
All tracks produced by Christian Geller.

It's Christmas track listing
No.	Title	Lyrics	Music	Length
1.	"Santa Claus Is Comin' to Town"	Haven Gillespie	J. Fred Coots	2:57
2.	"Grown-Up Christmas List"	David Foster; Linda Thompson-Jenner	Foster; Thompson-Jenner	3:55
3.	"The Christmas Song"	Robert Wells; Mel Tormé	Wells; Tormé	2:40
4.	"Mary's Little Baby"	Nadja Benaissa; Noël André Lunguana	Benaissa; Lunguana; Jerry Divmond	3:44
5.	"Have Yourself a Merry Little Christmas"	Hugh Martin; Ralph Blane	Martin; Blane	4:32
6.	"It's the Most Wonderful Time of the Year"	Edward Pola; George Wyle	Pola; Wyle	2:33
7.	"I Still Believe"	Christian Geller; Christoph Aßmann	Geller; Aßmann	3:17
8.	"Let It Snow! Let It Snow! Let It Snow!"	Sammy Cahn	Jule Styne	2:18
9.	"Someday at Christmas"	Ron Miller; Bryan Wells	Miller; Wells	3:30
10.	"Oh, Holy Night"	John Sullivan Dwight	Adolphe Adam	4:38
11.	"It's Christmas"	Nasri Atweh; Adam Messinger; George Nozuka; Jordan Orvosh	Atweh; Messinger; Nozuka; Orvosh	3:41
12.	"Santa Baby"	Joan Javits; Philip Springer; Tony Springer	Joan Javits; P. Springer; T. Springer	2:42
13.	"This Christmas"	Donny Hathaway; Nadine McKinnor	Hathaway; McKinnor	3:59
14.	"Silent Night"	Joseph Mohr	Franz Xaver Gruber	5:24
15.	"I Still Believe" (pop version)	Geller; Aßmann	Geller; Aßmann	3:15
Total length:				53:13

== Personnel and credits ==
Credits adapted from the liner notes of It's Christmas.

Performers and musicians

- Teodora Atanasova – violoncelli
- Todor Bakardzhiev – trumpets
- Evgenia Bauer – viole
- Nadja Benaissa – vocals
- lliyana Bencheva – contrabassi
- Diamana Demireva – piccolo
- Lucy Diakovska – vocals
- Petia Dimitrova – violin
- Ralitza Dimova – viole
- Iva Dzhadzheva – violin
- Ivan Dyakov – violin
- Elena Dyakova – violoncelli
- Elena Ganova – violin
- Arnau Garrofe – clarinet, saxophone
- Naum Gruevski – clarinets
- Marina Hinova – violoncelli
- Dean Ivanov – oboe, english horns
- Margarita Kalcheva – contrabassi
- Yulia Katzarska – violin
- Rossen Kazandzhiev – violin
- Diana Koleva – violin
- Zdravka Komirova – conductor
- Teodora Konstantinova – violin
- Manuel Lopez – guitar
- Milen Maksimov – violin
- Valentin Metodiev – oboe
- George Miltiyadoff – bass, piano, drums, percussions
- Sandy Mölling – vocals
- Radoslav Nenchev – violoncelli
- Gocho Prakov – clarinets
- Nina Sokolova – violoncelli
- Diana Stancheva – violin
- Velislav Stoyanov – trombones
- Negina Stoyanova – conductor
- Martin Tashev – trumpets
- Victor Teodosiev – French horns
- Aleksandar Tyanov
- Gergana Velichkova – violin
- Diana Volkova – French horns
- Jessica Wahls – vocals
- Stefania Yankova – viole
- Ivan Yordanov – saxophone
- Nikolinka Yordanova – violin
- Maria Valchanova – viole
- Yavor Zhelev – flute

Technical and artwork

- Christoph Aßmann – editor, mixing
- Marcel Brell – photography
- Christian Geller – editor, mixing, producer, recording
- Georgi Gogov – sound engineer
- Maxim Goranov – sound engineer
- Leandro Jacob – immersive mixing engineer
- Anya Mahnken – vocal arranger
- George Miltiyadoff – arranger, conductor, pre-production, recording
- Ronald Reinsberg – graphic
- Dieter Wegner – mastering

== Charts ==
Chart performance
Chart (2025)	Peak position
Austrian Albums (Ö3 Austria)	26
German Albums (Offizielle Top 100)	10
German Pop Albums (Offizielle Top 100)	5

== Release history ==
Release history
Initial release date	Format(s)	Label	Ref.
21 November 2025	CD; LP; digital download; streaming	Stars by Edel	
28 November 2025	LP	Stars by Edel	
