= Still in Love with You – Summer 2025 =

2025 concert tour by No Angels

- Tour by No Angels
- Promotional poster for the tour
- Location: Austria; Germany; Switzerland
- Start date: 7 June 2025
- End date: 10 October 2025
- No. of shows: 11

No Angels concert chronology
- Celebration Tour (2022); Still in Love with You – Summer 2025 (2025); TwentyFive Live 2026 (2026)

Still In Love With You – Summer 2025 is a festival tour by German pop band No Angels, launched in support of their 25th anniversary. Named after their same-titled hit single from 2002, it marked their first set of live shows since their 2022 Celebration Tour in support of their 2021 studio album 20. Comprising eleven concerts, the festival tour began on 7 June 2025 at the Kulturzelt in Wolfhagen, Germany and concluded on 10 October 2025 at the Nachteulen Festival in Sursee, Switzerland.

The concerts largely drew from the setlists of the Celebration Tour, with many of the original touring musicians returning. No Angels received widespread acclaim for their energetic and nostalgic live performances, with critics highlighting their strong vocals, dynamic stage presence, and ability to engage multigenerational audiences, reaffirming their lasting impact on the pop music scene. A continuation of the tour, called TwentyFive Live 2026, followed in 2026.

== Background ==
In January 2021, after more than ten years without performing together, former No Angels members Nadja Benaissa, Lucy Diakovska, Sandy Mölling and Jessica Wahls reunited as group to release a new version of their debut single "Daylight in Your Eyes" to commemorate with the 2001 release of the song, followed by 20, their first full-length album release since 2009, with plans to expand the anniversary celebrations. Released to strong streaming numbers and a revived interest from the media and their fan base, the album debuted at number one on the German Albums Chart, becoming No Angels' first chart topper in nearly two decades, and reached the top ten in Austria and Switzerland. In June 2022, the band kicked off their Celebration Tour at the Kindl-Bühne Wuhlheide. Continued in September 2022, the tour compromised ten concerts throughout Germany and concluded on 8 October 2022.

Initially uncertain about their future as a recording group, the band assured they would keep performing together and in 2023, No Angels reunited for several festival concerts and one-off events. In the summer of 2024, contrary to previous statements in which the band had expressed that they could not envision releasing new material, they began recording a new studio album, It's Christmas, set to be released in November 2025. With their 25th anniversary on the horizon, the group revealed in October 2024 that the Christmas album would be preceded by Still in Love with You – Summer 2025, a festival tour in the summer of 2025. Their first set of live shows since the Celebration Tour, its initial schedule consisted of six shows. Further dates were announced in the following months, including performances in Switzerland and Austria, where concerts had either been cancelled or scheduled in 2022.

== Critical reception ==
Austrian public service broadcaster ORF praised the 21 June 2025 show in Vienna, writing: "No Angels proved to be a real crowd-puller [...] Surprisingly, they kicked off their set with their mega-hit "Daylight in Your Eyes." Anyone who thought the energy would fizzle out after such an explosive start was quickly proven wrong [...] The fans stayed fully engaged throughout the hour-long concert — whether it was the heartfelt ballad "All Cried Out," the Mediterranean-flavored "Still in Love With You," or their cover of the Eurythmics classic "There Must Be an Angel." By the time the final song, "Rivers of Joy," rolled around, even those in the very back rows — hundreds of meters from the glitter-pants-clad quartet — were clapping along. The powerhouse vocals served as a strong reminder of why they’ve sold five million albums. Kronen Zeitung commented on the same show: "During the performance by No Angels many felt transported back to the 2000s. The four familiar faces from the casting show era delivered their pop hits and proved that they've still got it." Lina Paulitsch from Austrian news magazine Falter found that the band was the "highlight of this year's Donauinselfest." She further wrote: "It was something all generations could agree on: in the audience, babies swayed alongside teenagers and their mothers and fathers. With No Angels looking just as they did back then, the crowd was taken on a brief journey back in time — to the innocent year of 2002."

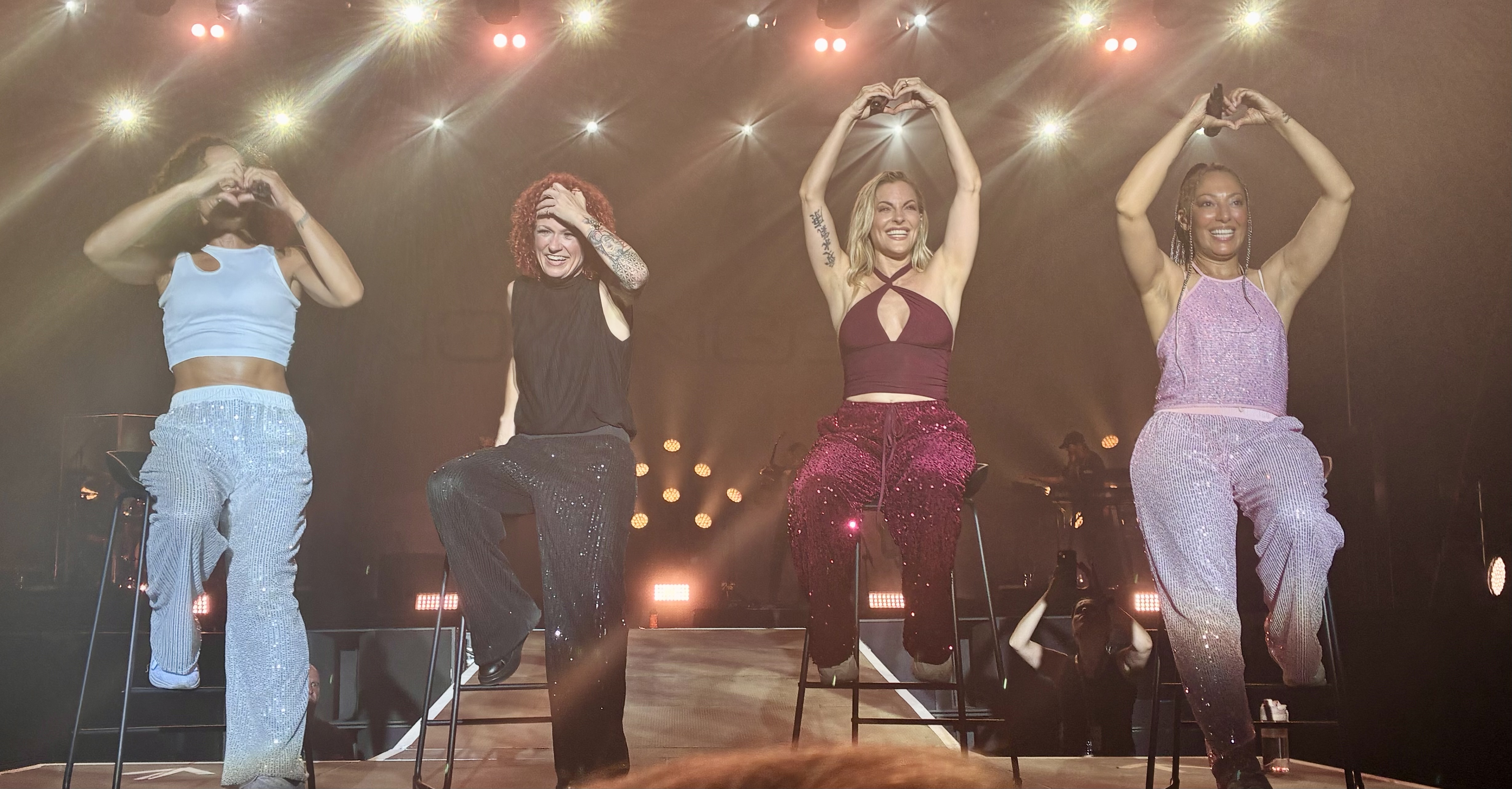
From left: Benaissa, Diakovska, Mölling, and Wahls at their 14 August 2025 concert in Bremerhaven.

Marcel Schwamborn, writing for Cologne newspaper Express, commented on the 28 June 2025 show: "No Angels really stole the show during their performance at Fühlinger See. The crowd celebrated the girl group with great enthusiasm." Stadt Spiegel editor Frank Zeising wrote about the same concert: "With powerful female energy, a strong stage presence, and their biggest hits, No Angels thrilled the audience. Emotions, nostalgia, and pure pop energy combined into an unforgettable performance that proved: they’re back – and stronger than ever." Braunschweiger Zeitung's Erwin Klein wrote about the show on 12 July 2025 in Braunschweig: "In the packed entertainment area of the Brawo Open, the former girl group stole the show on the tournament's final day – professional and seemingly ageless," while Lisa Klebaum from the Schwäbische Zeitung, commented on the 18 July show in Tuttlingen: "No Angels generated a lot of excitement and a great atmosphere in the festival tent [...] When band members Sandy Mölling, Lucy Diakovska, Nadja Benaissa, and Jessica Wahls took the stage, the crowd went wild." Mittelbayerische Zeitung editor Vanessa Meister wrote about the 23 July 2025 show in Regensburg: "The mild summer evening, the exuberant atmosphere, and an impressive stage show made their performance a highlight of the concert summer."

== Set list ==
This set list is representative of the 18 July 2025 show in Tuttlingen.

1. "Daylight in Your Eyes"
2. "All Cried Out"
3. "No Angel (It's All in Your Mind)"
4. "Mad Wild"
5. "Three Words"
6. "Send Me Flowers"
7. "Someday"
8. "Goodbye to Yesterday"
9. "Still in Love with You"
10. "A New Day"
11. "Let's Go to Bed" (contains elements of "You Could Be the First")
12. "Feelgood Lies"
13. "When the Angels Sing"
14. "Disappear"
15. "Something About Us"
16. "One Life"
17. "There Must Be an Angel"

Encore

18. "We Keep the Spirit Alive"
19. "Rivers of Joy" (contains elements of "We Found Love")

== Tour dates ==
List of concerts with date, city, country, and venue
Date	City	Country	Venue	Attendance
7 June 2025	Wolfhagen	Germany	Kulturzelt	2,100
21 June 2025	Vienna	Austria	Donauinselfest	Unknown
28 June 2025	Cologne	Germany	Rainbow Festival	22,000
6 July 2025	Breisach	Germany	Pinot & Rock Festival	Unknown
12 July 2025	Braunschweig	Germany	Brawo Open	Unknown
18 July 2025	Tuttlingen	Germany	Rundzelt in der Ruine	Unknown
19 July 2025	Berlin	Germany	Arena Gärten der Welt	5,000
23 July 2025	Regensburg	Germany	Piazza im Gewerbepark	1,700
3 August 2025	Lüneburg	Germany	Lüneburger Kultursommer	1,800
14 August 2025	Bremerhaven	Germany	Willy-Brand-Platz-Open Air	Unknown
10 October 2025	Sursee	Switzerland	Nachteulen Festival	Unknown
