= Summerjam =

Music festival in Cologne, Germany

Coordinates: 51°01′22″N 6°55′37″E

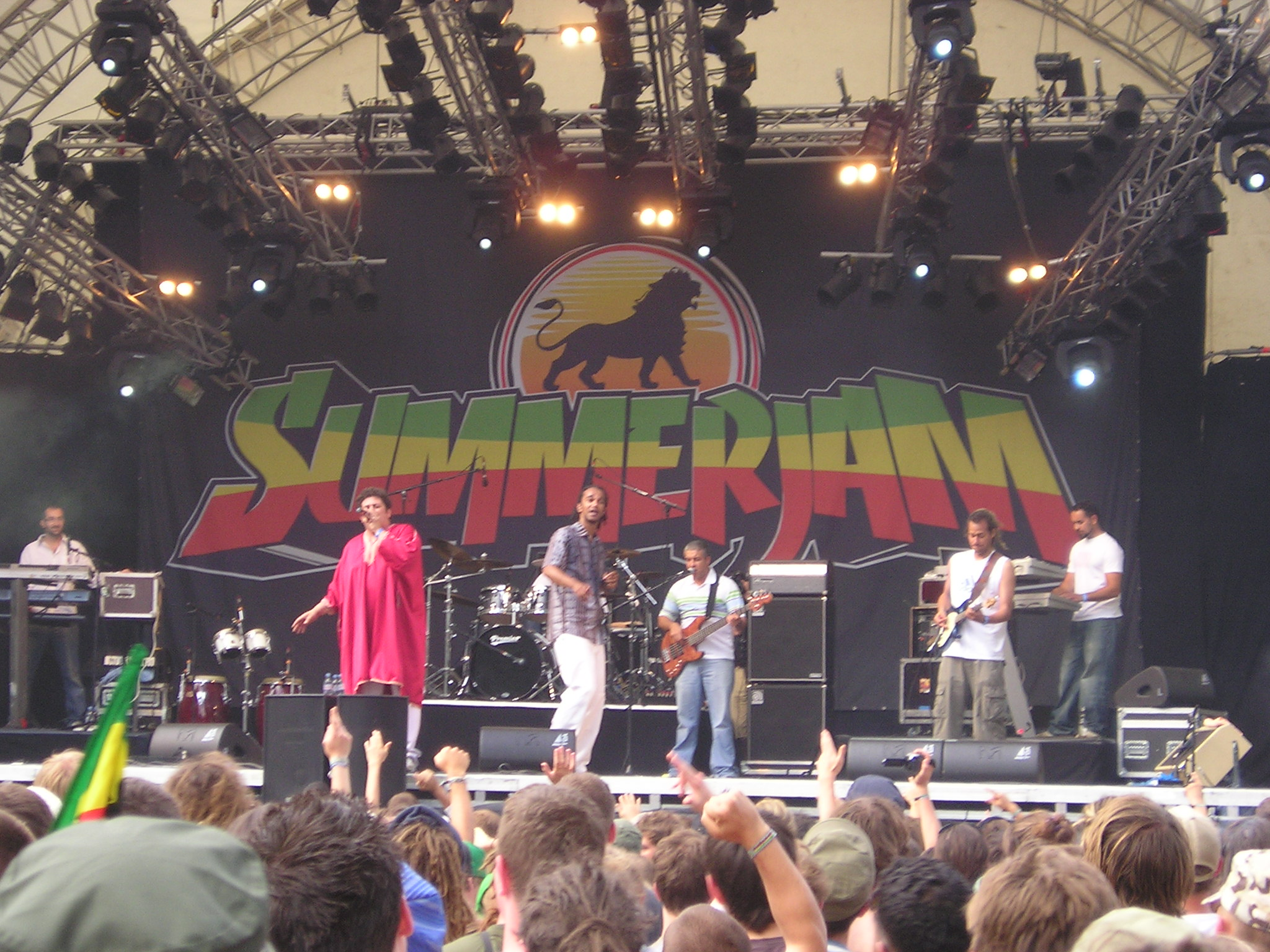
- Summerjam 2009
- Genre: Reggae; dancehall; hip-hop
- Dates: 3 days (first weekend in July)
- Frequency: Annual
- Locations: Fühlinger See, Cologne, Germany
- Years active: 1986–present
- Website: summerjam.de

Summerjam is a reggae, dancehall, and hip-hop festival that takes places annually in July at the Fühlinger See artificial lake in Cologne, Germany. The event was launched in 1986.

== Notable performers ==
Notable artists who have performed at Summerjam include Gentleman, Afrob, Dendemann, Milky Chance, Marteria, Ziggy Marley, the Skints, Alkaline, Chronixx, Sean Paul, Burning Spear, Stephen Marley, Tiken Jah Fakoly, Alborosie, Danakil, U-Roy, Million Stylez, Collie Buddz, J Boog, Sido, and Busy Signal.

== See also ==
- List of reggae festivals
