= Alweg =

Transportation company (1953–1964)

ALWEG
- Industry: Passenger transportation
- Founded: 1953
- Defunct: 1964
- Successor: Krupp
- Headquarters: Cologne, Germany

Alweg was a German transportation company known for its development of straddle-beam monorail technology.

== History ==
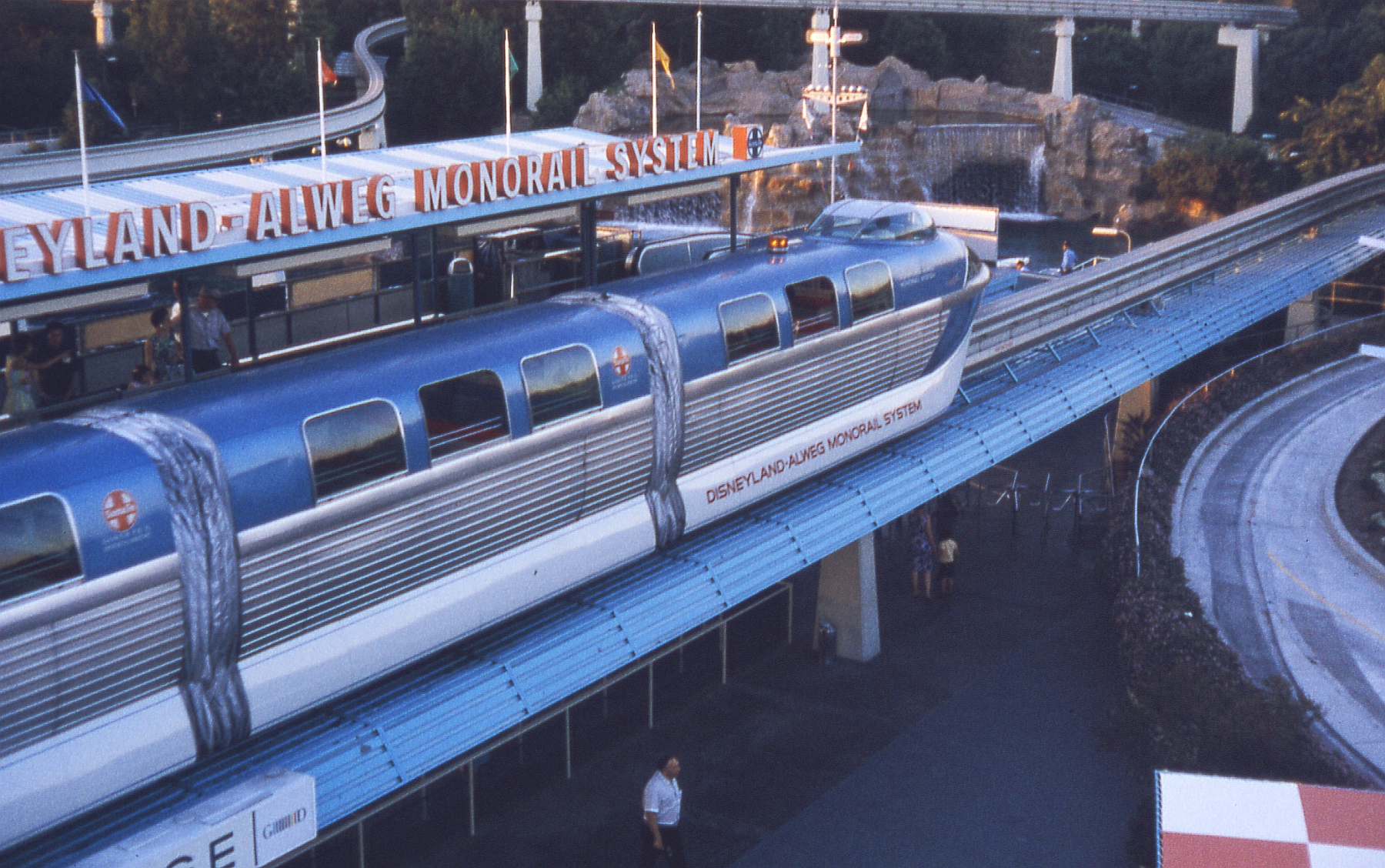
Disneyland-Alweg Monorail System, pictured in 1963

Alweg was established in January 1953 by Swedish industrialist Axel Lennart Wenner-Gren as Alweg-Forschung, GmbH (lit. 'Alweg Research Corporation'), based in the Fühlingen district of Cologne in West Germany. The company originated from the Verkehrsbahn-Studiengesellschaft (lit. 'Transit Railway Study Group'), which had presented early monorail designs and prototypes the previous year. The name "Alweg" is derived from Wenner-Gren’s full name.

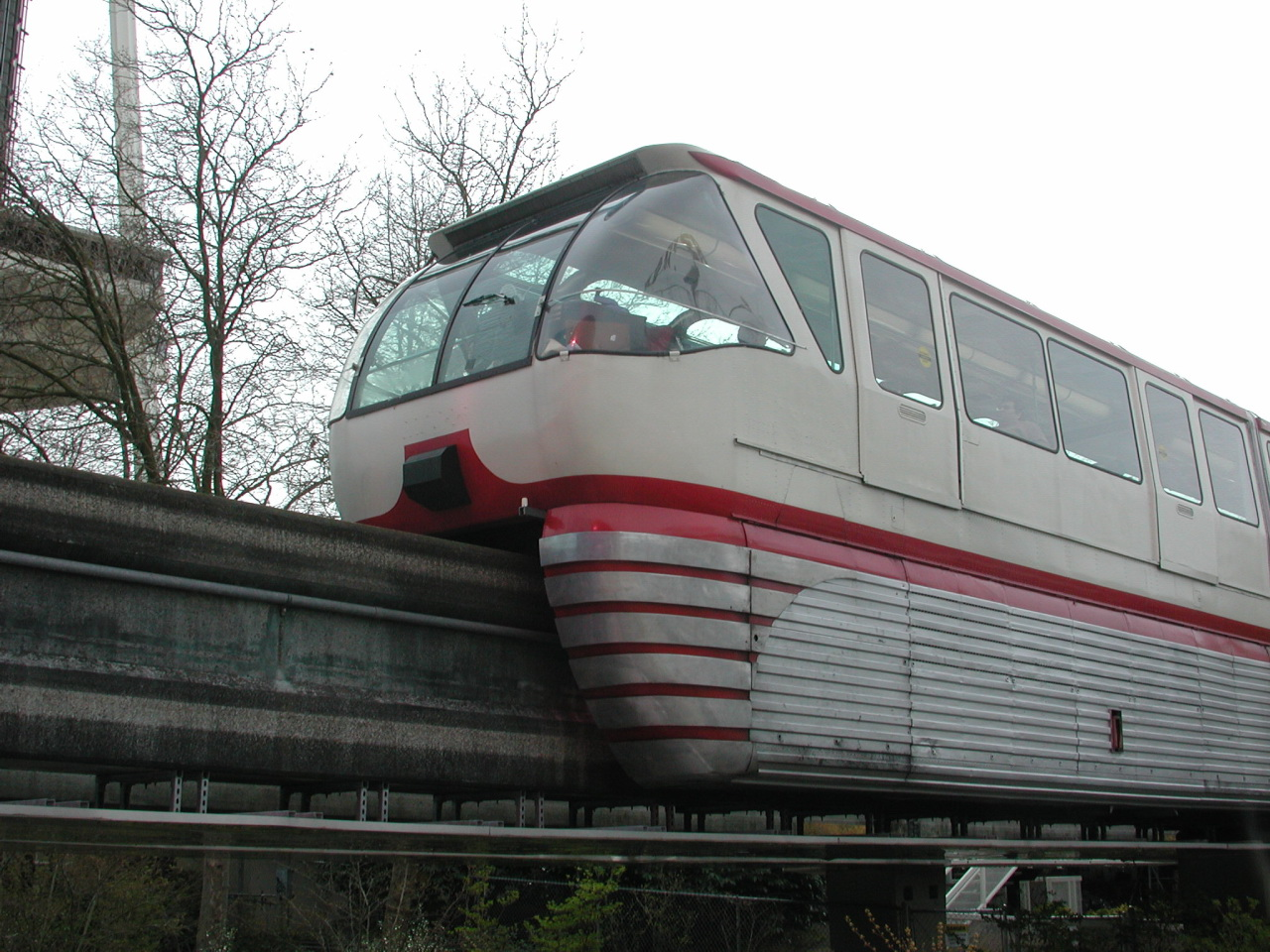
Seattle Center Monorail, pictured in 2008, still uses its original Alweg-built trains

Alweg developed several monorail systems during its operational years. Its most notable projects include the Disneyland Monorail (originally branded the Disneyland-Alweg Monorail System), which opened in 1959, and the Seattle Center Monorail, constructed for the 1962 Century 21 Exposition. Both systems remain in operation, with Seattle's still using original Alweg-built trains.

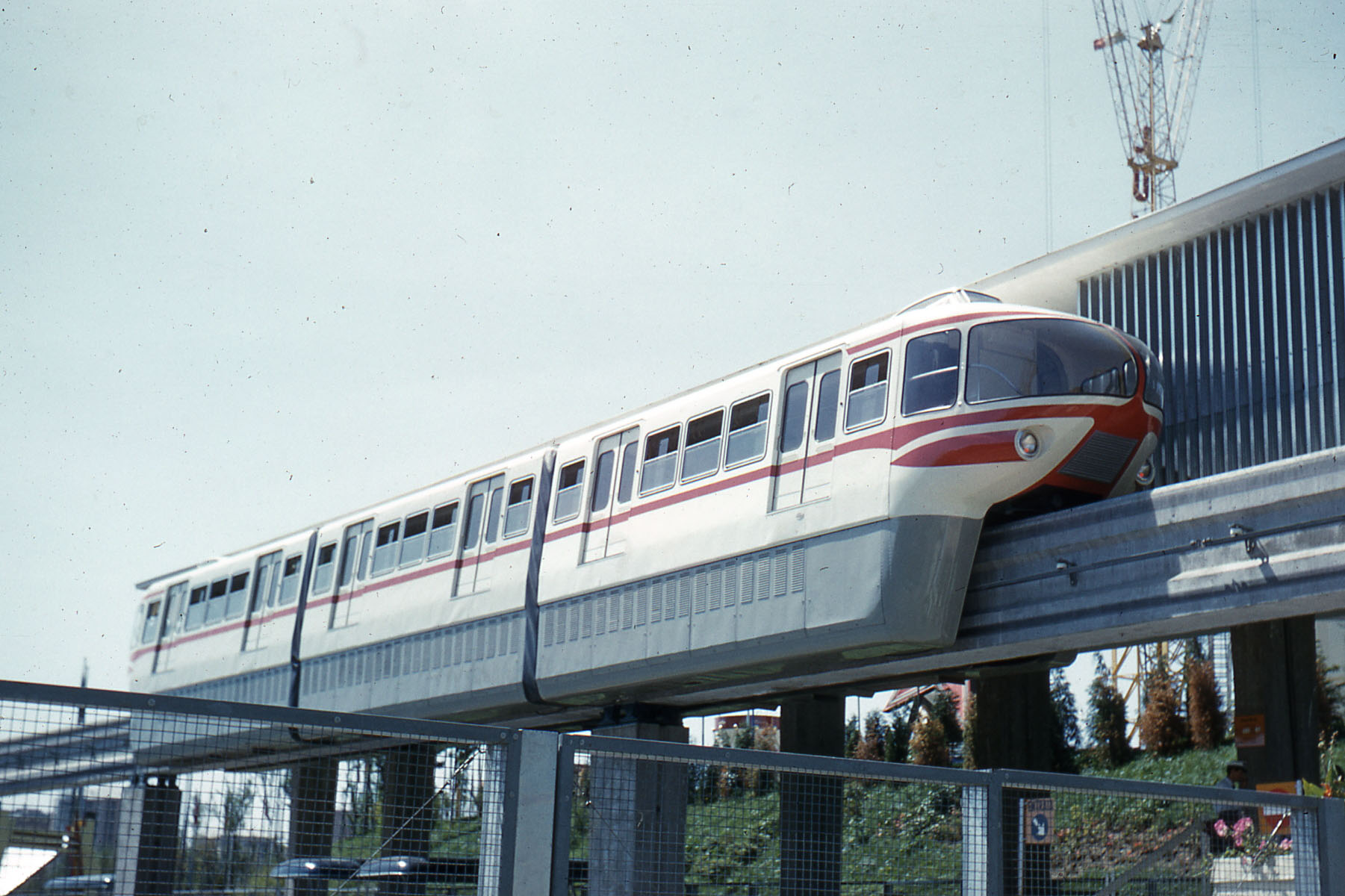
Turin Monorail

Another Alweg monorail system was constructed in Turin for the Italia '61 exposition. The line ceased operation shortly after the exposition ended and was later damaged by fire in the late 1970s, reportedly due to vandalism. It was dismantled in 1981, and its northern station was repurposed as an office building.

In 1963, Alweg submitted a proposal to the Los Angeles County Board of Supervisors for a privately funded monorail system in the county. The plan included design, construction, and operation of the system at Alweg's financial risk, with construction costs to be recouped through fare revenue. The proposal was ultimately rejected. Some sources attribute the decision to opposition from automotive and petroleum industry interests, including Standard Oil of California and General Motors. Author Ray Bradbury, a supporter of the proposal, later criticized the city's decision to develop a subway system instead.

In the 1960s, Alweg licensed its monorail technology to Hitachi, which continues to manufacture monorail systems based on the design. Notable examples include the Tokyo Monorail, opened in 1964, and the Chongqing Rail Transit system in China.

Alweg's operations were taken over by the industrial conglomerate Krupp following financial difficulties in the early 1960s. The company ceased operations by 1964.

== See also ==
- List of monorail systems
