= Fühlingen =

- Stadtteil of Cologne
- Location within Chorweiler
- Interactive map of Fühlingen
- Location within Germany Location within North Rhine-Westphalia
- Coordinates: 51°2′13″N 6°54′10″E
- Country: Germany
- State: North Rhine-Westphalia
- Admin. region: Cologne
- District: Urban district
- City: Cologne
- Borough: Chorweiler

Area
  - Total: 1.92 km^{2} (0.74 sq mi)

Population (2020-12-31)
  - Total: 2,083
  - Density: 1,080/km^{2} (2,810/sq mi)
- Time zone: UTC+01:00 (CET)
  - Summer (DST): UTC+02:00 (CEST)
- Postal codes: 50769
- Dialling codes: 0221

Fühlingen (German pronunciation: [ˈfyːlɪŋən]) is a village in the northern part of the city of Cologne. It is part of the borough of Chorweiler. Fühlingen is well known for its artificial lake, Fühlinger See.

== Location ==
The town is located in the north of the city of Cologne. The Rhine flows about two kilometers east of Fühlingen. On the east side of Fühlingen is the business area Feldkassel and to the north-east is the area Langel of the Cologne district Merkenich. To the northwest the district borders Worringen and on the west it borders Blumenberg, Chorweiler and Seeberg.

== History ==
Due to its location as a high-water hill to the west of the Rhine, Fühlingen was settled very early. Archaeological remains of settlements date back to the Neolithic period . In the area of Fühlinger lake there were several brick factories which dated to the Roman period. In the Middle Ages, the village was in the shadow of the larger Worringen, lying north, and consisted of only a few farms. The nearest parish church and the cemetery was St. Amandus in Rheinkassel. Fühlingen only had a small chapel.

The fortunes of the village changed in the late 19th century when the Oppenheim banking family established a stud farm with its own horse track for training purposes a few hundred meters south of the village. With the proceeds from the land sale, the Fühlingen population erected their own church, St. Mary, in 1887. A small school building was also built on the opposite side of the road. Archbishop Joseph Frings worked in St. Mary for several years as parish priest before moving to Cologne.

In 1922, Fühlingen was incorporated into Cologne. The Second World War left the place almost intact despite its proximity to the chemical plants in Leverkusen and Dormagen, as well as the anti aircraft batteries stationed in the vicinity.

Since July 15, 1954, the towns of Kasselberg, Langel, Feldkassel and Rheinkassel belonged to the district of Fühlingen. From October 7, 1963, they belong to Cologne-Merkenich.

In the mid-1950s a test track for the Alwegbahn, a monorail, was built at Fühlingen. The test track was demolished from 1967 onwards. Toward the middle of the 1960s, the city of Cologne planned to demolish the entire town in order to create a dividing green line between the planned industrial rail along the Rhine and the residential development of the "New Town" of Chorweiler. After violent protests by the residents, the plan was dropped again in 1973.

== Present town ==
The village still retains village structures, although a larger new construction area arose on the western edge and within the village numerous single- and two-family houses were built. Due to the village structure and its location in the middle of fields as well as the Fühlinger See, the place is a popular residential area. The World Rowing Championships have been held on the lake.

=== Buildings ===
- Haus Fühlingen: These are the remains of a protected stud farm from around 1880, built by Eduard Freiherr von Oppenheim . The house is 2.5 stories and has a loggia with an exterior staircase. According to the reports of the Cologne City Council of January 30, 2008, the house was to be restored with rental apartments planned. By August 2013, however, construction work had not yet begun.
- Farms: In Fühlingen there are several old estates, of which only a few are farmed. There is a former farm on the Neusser Landstraße which has a closed courtyard dating from around 1870. On the Arenzhofstraße is the Arenzhof from the year 1812. The Heinrichshof, which is still cultivated, was built around 1890. The Kriegerhof converted into apartments was built in 1892 and has a coat of arms. Finally there is the Schmittenhof from 1870, which also has a gate entrance. Furthermore, there are still many small farms, which have largely been rebuilt several times.
- Half-timbered house: In the middle of the town on the Neusser Landstraße is a guest house dating from 1752. It is a two-storey half-timbered house.
- St. Mary: The church was built in 1887/88 and expanded in 1934. Architects were Carl Rüdell and Richard Odenthal, who later also designed the Agneskirche in the Neustadt district of Cologne.
Fühlingen

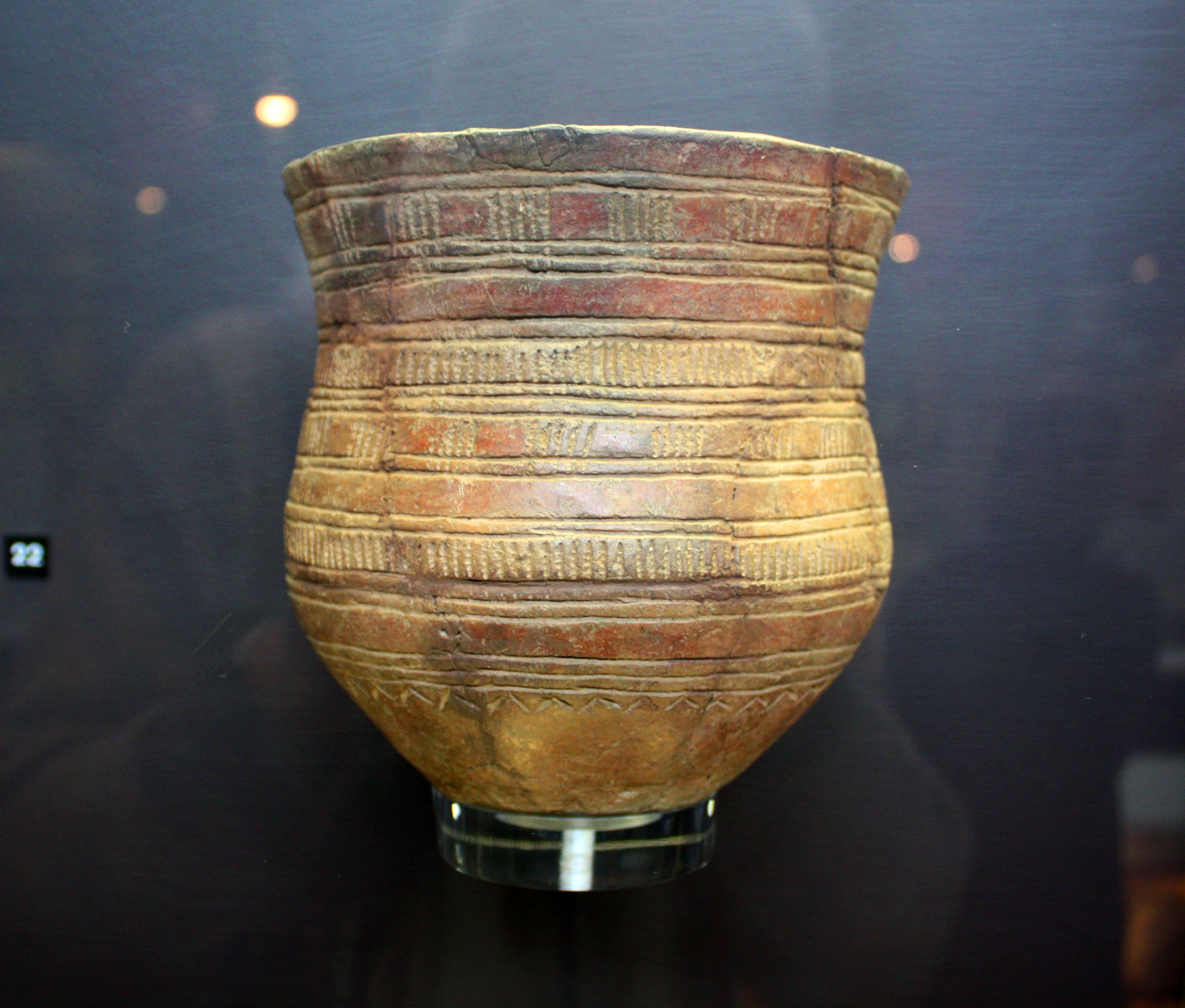
Neolithic bell beaker from Fühlingen, RGM-Cologne

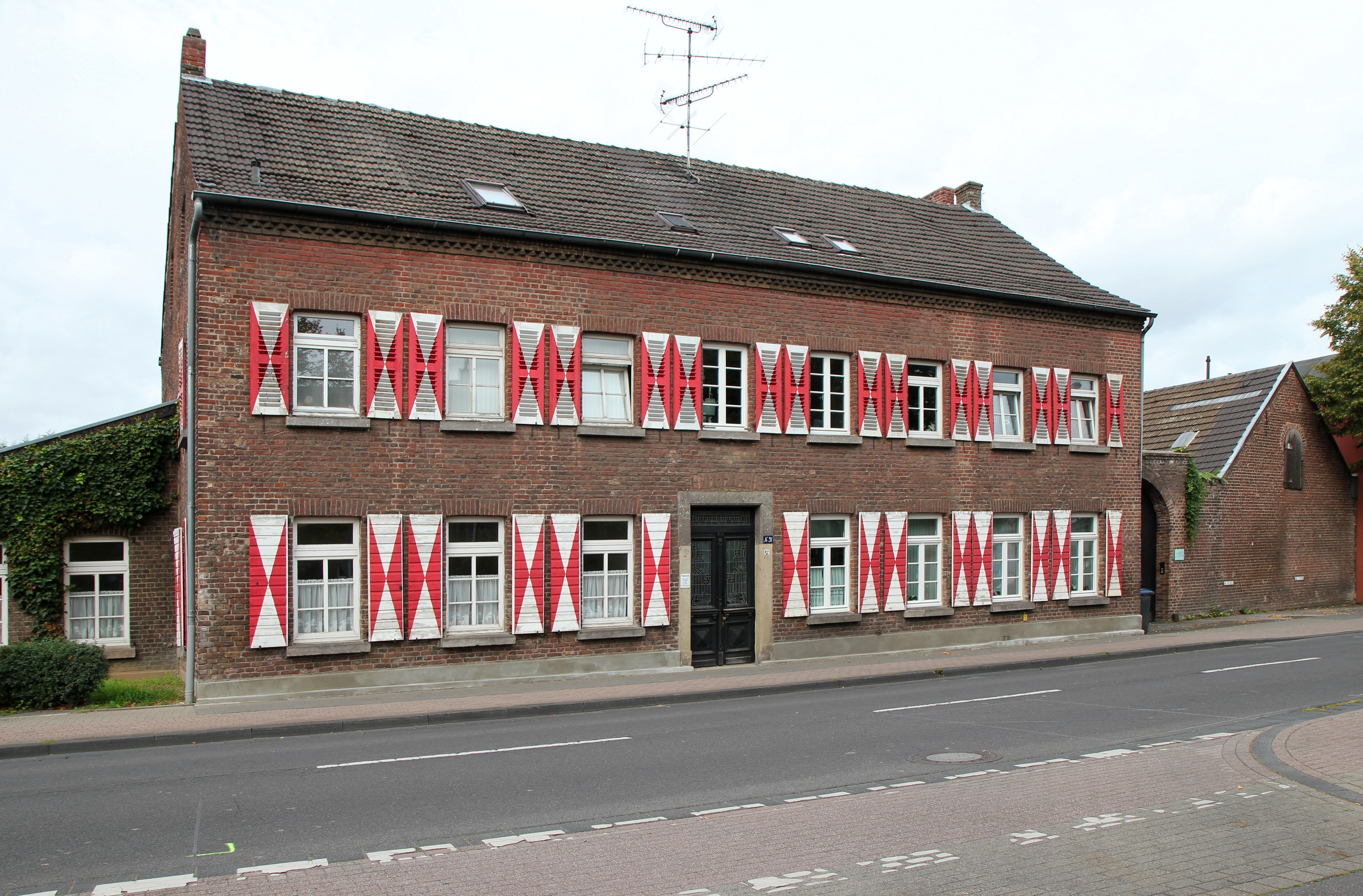
Old post office, Neusser Landstraße 31

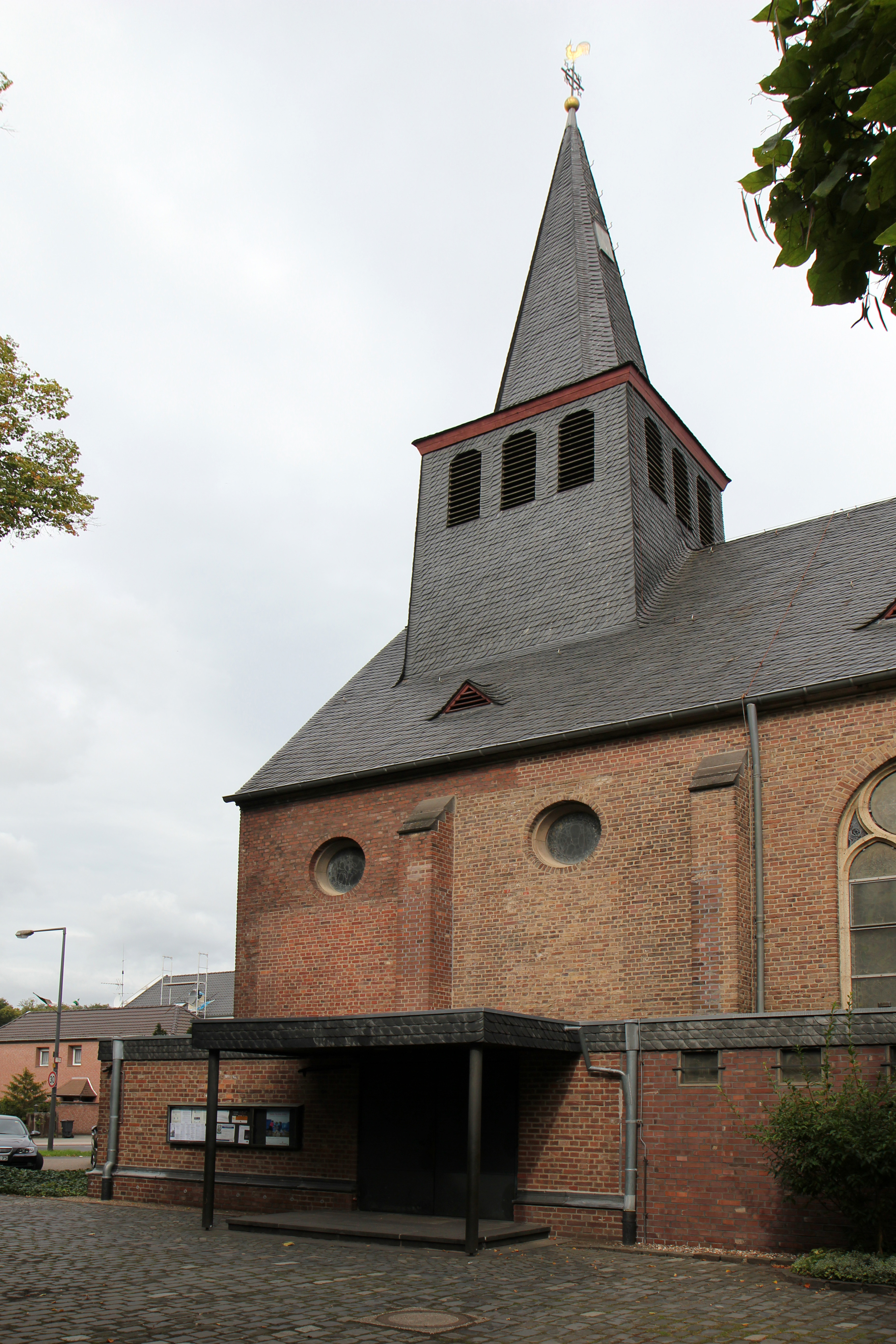
The Catholic church of St. Mary, Fühlingen

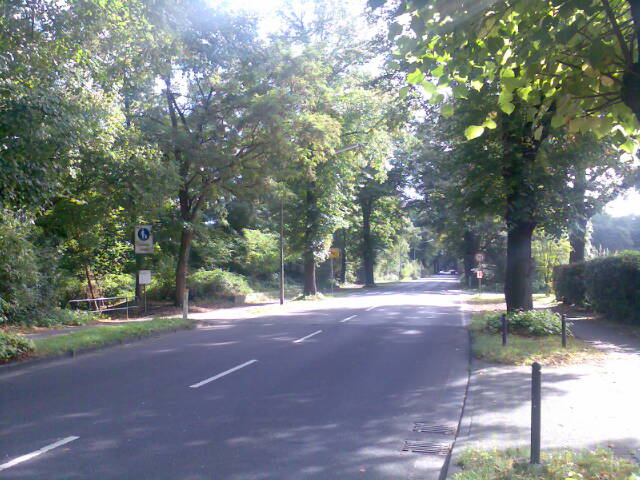
The crossing point of the former ALWEG track with Neusser Landstraße
