= I Still Believe (No Angels song) =

Single by No Angels

from the album It's Christmas
- Released: 10 October 2025
- Studio: Studio 61 (Kruft)
- Length: 3:15
- Label: Stars by Edel
- Songwriters: Christoph Aßmann; Christian Geller
- Producer: Christian Geller

No Angels singles chronology
"When the Angels Sing (Winter Version)" (2021)	"I Still Believe" (2025)	"Santa Claus Is Comin' to Town" (2025)

"I Still Believe" is a song by all-female German pop band No Angels. It was written by Christoph Aßmann and Christian Geller and recorded by the group as the theme for the 30th RTL-Spendenmarathon, an annual fundraising event organized by German television channel RTL's Wir helfen Kindern foundation since 1996. Production was overseen by Geller. Released by Stars by Edel as a single on 10 October 2025, "I Still Believe" was later included on the band's seventh studio album, It's Christmas (2025).

== Background ==
In January 2021, after more than ten years without performing together, former No Angels members Nadja Benaissa, Lucy Diakovska, Sandy Mölling and Jessica Wahls reunited as group to release a new version of their debut single "Daylight in Your Eyes" to commemorate with the 2001 release of the song, followed by 20, their first full-length album release since 2009, with plans to expand the anniversary celebrations. Released to strong streaming numbers and a revived interest from the media and their fan base, the album debuted at number one on the German Albums Chart, becoming No Angels' first chart topper in nearly two decades, and reached the top ten in Austria and Switzerland. In June 2022, the band kicked off their Celebration Tour at the Parkbühne Wuhlheide. Continued in September 2022, the tour compromised ten concerts throughout Germany and concluded on 8 October 2022. Initially uncertain about their future as a recording group, the band assured they would keep performing together and in 2023, No Angels reunited for several festival concerts and one-off events.

== Recording ==
In November 2024, No Angels member Nadja Benaissa participated in the RTL-Spendenmarathon, an annual fundraising event organized by German television network RTL through its Wir helfen Kindern foundation, serving as a volunteer on the donation hotline. During her participation, she was approached about the possibility of the No Angels contributing to the following year's campaign. According to Benaissa, she immediately knew that the other members would be willing to participate, and three months later the group was confirmed as performers of the campaign's official theme song. Their manager, songwriter and producer Christian Geller was commissioned to create the song. The recording process was described by the group as particularly meaningful, with Lucy Diakovska comparing it to the group's early career, stating: "We felt like we did 25 years ago with "Daylight in Your Eyes." Each of us can identify with the song so strongly." Jessica Wahls described the song as a message of hope: "Many people feel overwhelmed and lose hope. With our song, we want to send a small message and say: hope still exists," while Nadja Benaissa added that she hoped the song would "comfort people, give them strength, and make them feel understood." Sandy Mölling said the group was "incredibly happy" to contribute to the fundraising campaign, emphasizing their concern for children affected by conflicts around the world.

== Music video ==
A music video for "I Still Believe" was filmed in the week of 11 August 2025 at Christian Geller's Studio 61 in Kruft along with four additional visuals from the It's Christmas album, including's the official video for the album's title track. Largely filmed against a black backdrop, the video features solo and group close-ups of the band members, who appear nude. Underscoring the song's themes, interspersed throughout are scenes of children from conflict-affected regions around the world, as well as footage of humanitarian organizations providing assistance. Marcel Brell directed "I Still Believe." It premiered on 10 October 2025 at 10:00 CET..

== Personnel and credits ==
Credits adapted from the liner notes of "I Still Believe."

- Christoph Aßmann – writer
- Nadja Benaissa – vocals
- Lucy Diakovska – vocals
- Christian Geller – producer, writer
- Sandy Mölling – vocals
- Jessica Wahls – vocals

== Release history ==
Release dates and formats for "I Still Believe"
Region	Date	Format	Label	Edition(s)	Ref
Various	10 October 2025	Digital download; streaming	Stars by Edel	Pop version	
