= Ich bin ein Star – Holt mich hier raus! season 17 =

Ich bin ein Star – Holt mich hier raus!
- Season 17
- Presented by: Sonja Zietlow; Jan Köppen
- No. of days: 17
- No. of contestants: 12
- Winner: Lucy Diakovska
- Runner-up: Leyla Lahouar
- No. of episodes: 17

Release
- Original network: RTL
- Original release: 19 January – 4 February 2024

Season chronology
- Next → Season 18

Ich bin ein Star – Holt mich hier raus! returned for its seventeenth series on 19 January 2024 on RTL. Sonja Zietlow and Jan Köppen returned for their seventeenth and second season as hosts, respectively. Also the paramedic Bob McCarron alias "Dr. Bob" was back.

On 4 February 2024, the season was won by Lucy Diakovska, with Leyla Lahouar finishing as the runner-up.

== Celebrities ==
The celebrity cast line-up for the seventeenth series was confirmed on 29 December 2023.

Celebrity	Known for	Status
Lucy Diakovska	singer (member of No Angels)	Winner on 4 February 2024
Leyla Lahouar	reality TV contestant (Der Bachelor)	Runner-up on 4 February 2024
Tim Kampmann	singer and influencer	Third place on 4 February 2024
Fabio Knez	reality TV contestant (Make Love, Fake Love, Are You the One?)	Eliminated 7th on 3 February 2024
Mike Heiter	reality TV contestant (Das Sommerhaus der Stars, Kampf der Realitystars)	Eliminated 6th on 3 February 2024
Kim Virginia Hartung	reality TV contestant (Der Bachelor, Temptation Island)	Eliminated 5th on 1 February 2024
Felix von Jascheroff	actor	Eliminated 4th on 31 January 2024
Heinz Hoenig	actor	Withdrew on 30 January 2024
David Odonkor	professional footballer	Eliminated 3rd on 29 January 2024
Anya Elsner	reality TV contestant (Germany's Next Topmodel)	Eliminated 2nd on 28 January 2024
Sarah Kern	fashion designer	Eliminated 1st on 27 January 2024
Cora Schumacher	ex-wife of Ralf Schumacher	Withdrew on 21 January 2024

== Results and elimination ==
Indicates that the celebrity received the most votes from the public
Indicates that the celebrity received the fewest votes and was eliminated immediately (no bottom two)
Indicates that the celebrity was in the bottom two of the public vote

Daily results per celebrity
	Day 9	Day 10	Day 11	Day 12	Day 13	Day 14	Day 15	Day 16	Day 17 Final		Number of trials
	Day 9	Day 10	Day 11	Day 12	Day 13	Day 14	Day 15	Day 16	Round 1	Round 2	Number of trials
Lucy	7th 7.27%	4th 10.01%	6th 8.74%	1st 19.68%	4th 13.89%	1st 26.81%	1st 28.61%	1st 26.99%	1st 50.21%	Winner; 64.49%	7
Leyla	3rd 11.94%	2nd 13.49%	2nd 15.60%	3rd 18.59%	2nd 18.11%	3rd 15.91%	5th 14.43%	3rd 20.00%	2nd 25.82%	Runner-up; 35.51%	7
Tim	1st 22.45%	1st 22.44%	1st 18.84%	2nd 18.87%	5th 13.47%	5th 12.35%	2nd 25.43%	2nd 21.42%	3rd 23.97%	Eliminated (Day 17)	9
Fabio	2nd 13.37%	3rd 12.38%	4th 12.52%	4th 15.78%	6th 12.75%	2nd 20.44%	3rd 15.86%	4th 16.36%	Eliminated (Day 16)		5
Mike	5th 9.15%	5th 9.71%	5th 9.01%	6th 8.84%	1st 19.71%	4th 13.04%	4th 15.67%	5th 15.23%	Eliminated (Day 16)		7
Kim Virginia	4th 10.23%	6th 6.66%	7th 7.74%	7th 8.50%	3rd 14.09%	6th 11.45%	Eliminated (Day 14)				6
Felix	8th 7.04%	7th 6.43%	8th 6.86%	5th 9.74%	7th 8.52%	Eliminated (Day 13)					3
Heinz	6th 7,95%	9th 5.86%	3rd 14.47%	Withdrew (Day 11)							3
David	9th 4.54%	8th 5.87%	9th 6.58%	Eliminated (Day 11)							3
Anya	10th 3.56%	10th 4.25%	Eliminated (Day 10)								3
Sarah	11th 2.50%	Eliminated (Day 9)									2
Cora	Withdrew (Day 3)										2
Notes	None			1	None		2	None	3		
Bottom two	Anya; Sarah	Anya; Heinz	David; Felix	Kim Virginia; Mike	Fabio; Felix	Kim Virginia; Tim	Leyla; Mike	None			
Eliminated	Sarah; 2.50% to save	Anya; 4.25% to save	David; 6.58% to save	Eviction cancelled	Felix; 8.52% to save	Kim Virginia; 11.45% to save	Eviction cancelled	Mike; 15.23% to save	Tim; 23.97% to win	Leyla; 35.51% to win	
Eliminated	Sarah; 2.50% to save	Anya; 4.25% to save	David; 6.58% to save	Eviction cancelled	Felix; 8.52% to save	Kim Virginia; 11.45% to save	Eviction cancelled	Fabio; 16.36% to save	Tim; 23.97% to win	Lucy; 64.49% to win	

=== Notes ===
- ^Note 1: On day 12, none of the celebrities were eliminated because of Heinz' withdrawal on Day 11.
- ^Note 1: On day 15, none of the celebrities were eliminated because of Cora's withdrawal on Day 3.
- ^Note 3: The public voted for who they wanted to win, rather than save.

== Bushtucker trials ==
The contestants take part in daily trials to earn food. These trials aim to test both physical and mental abilities. The winner is usually determined by the number of stars collected during the trial, with each star representing a meal earned by the winning contestant for their camp mates.

The public voted for who they wanted to face the trial
The contestants decided who did which trial
The trial was compulsory and neither the public nor celebrities decided who took part

Trial number	Air date	Name of trial	Celebrity participation	Public %/ Contestants vote	Number of stars	Notes
1	18 January	"Wasserfall" ("Waterfall")	Anya; David; Fabio; Felix; Kim Virginia; Leyla; Lucy; Mike; Sarah; Tim	—N/a	7/10 stars	4
2	18 January	"Das Boat" ("The Boat")	Cora; Heinz	—N/a	2/2 stars	none
3	19 January	"Würg & Travel" ("Gag & Travel")	All celebrities	—N/a	6/12 stars	5
4	20 January	"Quarter-Schreck" ("Quarter-Scare")	Tim; Kim Virginia	27.32% 14.43%	5/12 stars	none
5	21 January	"Ich bin im Spa – Holt mich hier raus!" ("I'm in the Spa – Get Me Out of Here!")	Tim; Leyla	26.40% 15.66%	0/12 stars	none
6	22 January	"Panodrama-Blick" ("Panodrama View")	Leyla	48.26%	10/11 stars	none
7	23 January	"Reparatortur" ("Repair Torture")	Leyla	22.29%	0/11 stars	none
8	24 January	"Bäh-tonmischer" ("Ugh-crete Mixer")	Anya; Kim Virginia	29.53% 24.65%	0/11 stars	none
9	25 January	"Bah!res für Gares" ("Yuck!-Cash for Done Food")	Kim Virginia; Felix; Tim	40.07% 13.73% 11.16%	10/11 stars	none
10	26 January	"Der große Preis von Murwillumbah" ("Murwillumbah Grand Prix")	Kim Virginia; Mike; Tim	39.42% Kim Virginia's choice Kim Virginia's choice	0/11 stars	6
11	27 January	"Im Darm von Cobra 11" ("In the Colon of Cobra 11")	Kim Virginia	42.90%	7/11 stars	none
12	28 January	"Ich bin im Spa – die Runde danach" ("I'm in the Spa - the Round After")	Lucy; David	7 of 20; 6 of 20	10/10 stars	none
13	29 January	"Der Eisbrecher" ("The Icebreaker")	Fabio; Mike; Heinz	9 of 27; 8 of 27; 5 of 27	7/9 stars	none
14	30 January	"Hotel Versage" ("Hotel Mess Up")	Lucy	7 of 8	4/8 stars	none
15	31 January	"Gondel La Grause" ("Gondola La Horror")	Mike; Fabio	5 of 14; 3 of 14	3/7 stars	none
16	1 February	"Reparatortur 2.0" ("Repairtorture 2.0")	Lucy	4 of 6	5/6 stars	none
17	2 February	"Mauerfail" ("Wall Fail")	Mike; Tim	4 of 10; 3 of 10	3/5 stars	none
18	3 February	"Creek der Sterne" ("Creek of Stars")	Fabio; Leyla; Lucy; Mike; Tim	—N/a	5/5 stars	none
19	4 February	Appetizer: "Footwork"	Tim	—N/a	5/5 stars	none
20	4 February	Main dish: "Energy"	Lucy	—N/a	4/5 stars	none
21	4 February	Dessert: "Passion"	Leyla	—N/a	0/5 stars	none

Notes

- ^4 David, Fabio, Felix, Kim Virginia, Leyla, Lucy, Mike & Tim won one Star each. Mike's Star was later deducted due to a rule infringement.
- ^5 Kim Virginia, Mike, Heinz, Fabio, David & Felix won one Star each.
- ^6 Kim Virginia could select 2 additional campmates to take part in the Trial.

=== Result table: Who Should go to the Bushtucker Trials? ===
Celebrity	Day 1	Day 2	Day 3	Day 4	Day 5	Day 6	Day 7	Day 8
Lucy	4.87%	5.98%	4.58%	4.77%	3.85%	3.75%	5.49%	5.51%
Leyla	7.84%	15.66%	48.26%	22.29%	10.77%	5.13%	6.19%	6.21%
Tim	27.32%	26.40%	14.81%	13.12%	11.06%	11.16%	8.17%	6.66%
Fabio	3.85%	5.13%	Blocked	5.89%	Blocked	5.67%	8.10%	6.84%
Mike	5.73%	7.02%	5.15%	6.64%	5.32%	5.01%	7.77%	5.53%
Kim Virginia	14.43%	9.94%	7.85%	18.20%	24.65%	40.07%	39.42%	42.90%
Felix	6.96%	7.40%	6.19%	7.69%	7.32%	13.73%	8.17%	6.66%
Heinz	Blocked	Blocked	Blocked	Blocked	Blocked	Blocked	Blocked	Blocked
David	3.60%	4.02%	3.12%	4.00%	3.38%	3.36%	5.10%	5.88%
Anya	11.92%	14.44%	7.49%	11.27%	29.53%	8.34%	7.49%	7.11%
Sarah	2.83%	4.01%	2.55%	6.13%	4.12%	3.78%	5.60%	4.85%
Cora	10.65%	Out						

== Star count ==
Celebrity	Trials	Awarded stars	Possible stars	Percentage	Stars
Lucy	7	20.5	27.5	74.55%	20.5/27.5 stars
Leyla	7	12	36	33.33%	12/36 stars
Tim	9	13.33	28.84	46.22%	13.33/28.84 stars
Fabio	5	6.83	9.5	71.89%	6.83/9.5 stars
Mike	7	7.33	15.67	46.78%	7.33/15.67 stars
Kim Virginia	6	14.83	31.84	46.58%	14.83/31.84 stars
Felix	3	5.33	5.67	94.00%	5.33/5.67 stars
Heinz	3	4.33	5	86.6%	4.33/5 stars
David	3	7.5	7.5	100%	7.5/7.5 stars
Anya	3	0	7.5	0%	0/7.5 stars
Sarah	2	0	2	0%	0/2 stars
Cora	2	1	2	50%	1/2 stars

== Treasure Hunt ==
The candidates go on a treasure hunt in pairs and solve a task. If successful, they usually bring a treasure chest to the camp. There the chest is opened, in which there is a quiz question with two possible answers. If the candidates answer the task correctly, there is a profit such as sweets or spices; if they answer incorrectly, there is a useless consolation prize such as a garden gnome. Less often there is an instant win after completing the task.

The celebrities got the question correct
The celebrities got the question wrong

Episode	Air date	Celebrities	Task	Questions and answers	Prize won	Notes
3	21 January	Anya; David	"No Risk, No Keys"	Kangaroos can neither jump nor run backwards. True or false? A: True; B: False	A teabag	none
6	24 January	Fabio; Heinz	"Buchstabensuppe" ("Alphabet Soup")	Failed		
9	27 January	Leyla; Mike	"Nachtschatzsuche" ("Nightly Treasure Hunt")	No question	A slice of pizza	none
13	31 January	Felix; Leyla	"Kopf über Magen" ("Head over Stomach")	How many consonants do follow each other in the word "Angstschweiß" (Cold sweat)? A: 12; B: 8	Potato crisps	none

== Ratings ==
Ratings of season 14
Episode		Duration (without advertising)	Date	Viewers		Share		Source
Episode		Duration (without advertising)	Date	Total	14-49 years	Total	14-49 years	Source
1	"Who should go to the Bushtucker Trials?"	156 Min.	19 January 2024	5.31 Mio.	2.48 Mio.	21.7%	40.7%	
2	"Who should go to the Bushtucker Trials?"	84 Min.	20 January 2024	4.68 Mio.	2.11 Mio.	15.6%	28.7%	
3	"Who should go to the Bushtucker Trials?"	30 Min.	21 January 2024	4.68 Mio.	2.20 Mio.	14.4%	27.9%	
4	"Who should go to the Bushtucker Trials?"	91 Min.	22 January 2024	3.85 Mio.	1.31 Mio.	24.3%	34.8%	
5	"Who should go to the Bushtucker Trials?"	91 Min.	23 January 2024	3.52 Mio.	1.29 Mio.	23.0%	35.2%	
6	"Who should go to the Bushtucker Trials?"	91 Min.	24 January 2020	3.34 Mio.	1.35 Mio.	21.9%	34.4%	
7	"Who should go to the Bushtucker Trials?"	94 Min.	25 January 2020	3.47 Mio.	1.42 Mio.	24.0%	41.8%	
8	"Who should go to the Bushtucker Trials?"	91 Min.	26 January 2020	3.90 Mio.	1.69 Mio.	20.4%	32.9%	
9	"Who should stay in the Camp?"	93 Min.	27 January 2024	4.02 Mio.	1.53 Mio.	21.6%	32.5%	
10	"Who should stay in the Camp?"	32 Min.	28 January 2024	4.33 Mio.	1.77 Mio.	14.0%	24.5%	
11	"Who should stay in the Camp?"	93 Min.	29 January 2024	3.69 Mio.	1.42 Mio.	23.9%	38.7%	
12	"Who should stay in the Camp?"	95 Min.	30 January 2024	3.77 Mio.	1.32 Mio.	22.9%	34.9%	
13	"Who should stay in the Camp?"	92 Min.	31 January 2024	3.38 Mio.	1.29 Mio.	22.5%	34.6%	
14	"Who should stay in the Camp?"	97 Min.	1 February 2024	3.76 Mio.	1.43 Mio.	23.9%	39.2%	
15	"Who should stay in the Camp?"	101 Min.	2 February 2024	3.87 Mio.	1.56 Mio.	20.8%	34.4%	
16	"Who should stay in the Camp?"	90 Min.	3 February 2024	4.12 Mio.	1.51 Mio.	19.9%	29.9%	
17	"Final"	117 Min.	4 February 2024	4.49 Mio.	1.69 Mio.	29.3%	45.4%	
18	"The Big Reunion"		5 February 2024					
19	"The Big Aftermath"		18 February 2024					
