= Deichbrand =

German music festival

Coordinates: 53.7583°N 8.6750°E

Deichbrand is a music festival that takes place in or near Cuxhaven, usually every July/August. The festival and its guests are generally associated with metal, emo, rock, pop, and hip-hop. Deichbrand was sold out in advance for the first time, with an attendance of about 18,000 people in 2011.

== History and venues ==
Deichbrand was founded by Marc Engelke and Daniel Schneider, creating a festival highlight for young people around the sea region. The first edition of the festival took place at Fort Kugelbake (northernmost spot of Lower Saxony), Cuxhaven, on September 2, 2005, and was attended by 500 people. Acts for the first edition included Die Apokalyptischen Reiter, Lost Dayz, and much more. Daily tickets were sold for €12.

„It´s a long way to the top if you wanna Rock´n´Roll!“ was the slogan of Deichbrand in 2006. The festival organization was in the red, but Deichbrand took place just of the dike between Cuxhaven and Altenbruch. In 2006, the event was attended by 4,000 people and included acts such as Revolverheld or Schandmaul. The festival was supported by volunteers and sponsored by companies like Veltins. The 3rd edition of Deichbrand took place on August 24, 2007. Since 2007 the event had been holding 2 stages, Fire Stage and Water Stage. In 2007, Deichbrand took place in a new location close to the old of 2006. Since 2009, after annual location changes, Deichbrand had been well established at sea-airport Cuxhaven/Nordholz. Nowadays, Deichbrand focuses more and more on international acts such as Mando Diao or Dropkick Murphys.

== Past dates and lineups ==
=== 2005 ===
The first Deichbrand festival took place on 2 and 3 September 2005 at Fort Kugelbake, Cuxhaven. The first edition included acts such as Mob Rules, Regicide, Die Familie, Die Apokalyptischen Reiter or The Jinxs.

=== 2006 ===
The second Deichbrand took place on 18 and 19 August 2006. This time the festival was located at Grodener Deich, between Cuxhaven’s fish harbor and an offshore test area. Because of the big success of last year the organizers invited more famous bands to the festival.

- Revolverheld
- Schandmaul
- Drone
- Brainstorm
- The Jinxs
- Pussy Galore
- Mystic Prophecy
- Regicide
- Maroon
- Kasa
- A Chinese Restaurant
- Die Familie
- Experience X
- Finisterre
- From Behind
- Gas
- Immortal Sin
- Kerndrift
- Kokusu
- Liquid Fire
- Lost Dayz
- Maggers United
- Mary Bleeds Wine
- Muff
- Nayled
- Nirgendwo
- Odeon
- Poolstar
- Presence Of Mind
- Pussy Galore
- Remirra
- Sandro
- Scufx
- Subsonic
- The Aurora Project
- The Marble Index
- Tuesdays Hangover
- Ötteband

In 2006 the festival was sponsored by companies like Veltins V+, Gizeh, WOM, Natural American Spirit, and more.

=== 2007 ===
The 3rd festival took place between 24 and 25 August 2007. The festival became more and more famous across the borders.

- H-Blockx
- Subway to Sally
- Madsen
- The Films
- iO ex Guano Apes
- Gods of Blitz
- Kim Frank
- Klee
- Volbeat
- Days in Grief
- Karpatenhund
- Schrottgrenze
- One Fine Day
- Regicide
- Fire in the Attic
- Neuser
- 5BUGS
- The Jinxs
- Loz Tinitoz
- A Chinese Restaurant
- Gas
- From Behind
- Tiny-Y-Son
- Kill Fill
- Mad Lane
- Crack'n Up's
- Presence of mind

==== Debuts ====
Subway to Sally played a few songs before they released their new album Bastard. All in all, were more than 7500 visitors at Deichbrand.

=== 2008 ===
The 4th and until now longest festival took place between 22 and 24 August 2008.

- Sportfreunde Stiller
- Donots
- Deichkind
- Oomph!
- Die Happy
- Tomte
- Turbostaat
- 4Lyn
- Blackmail
- Jennifer Rostock
- EL*KE
- Empty Trash
- Escapado
- Kilians
- Trashmonkeys
- Letzte Instanz
- Grand Avenue
- Die Schröders
- Monsters of Liedermaching
- Blind
- Roman Fischer
- Tiny-Y-Son
- Übermutter
- Revolving Door
- Odeville
- Pilefunk
- Krieger
- A Chinese Restaurant
- Dramaking
- Muff
- Crossing
- Immortal Sin
- Till the Extase
- Kill Fill

=== 2009 ===
- Mando Diao
- ASP
- 4Lyn
- Lotto King Karl
- Jennifer Rostock
- Luxuslärm
- Dúné
- Emil Bulls
- Ignite
- Coppelius
- Monsters of Liedermaching
- The Streets
- Dropkick Murphys
- Selig
- Polarkreis 18
- Eisbrecher
- Apoptygma Berzerk
- The Disco Boys
- Northern Lite
- Smoke Blow
- Chapeau Claque
- P:lot
- Grossstadtgeflüster
- Boppin’B
- Trashmonkeys
- Sugarplum Fairy
- Bosse
- Olli Schulz
- Fertig, los!
- One Fine Day
- Auletta
- Black Sheep
- Leavin' Soho
- Space Off
- The Swindle
- Kim?
- Loz Tinitoz
- mp3.de Newcomer

=== 2010 ===
Deichbrand took place at Seeflughafen Cuxhaven/Nordholz, near Wanhöden, between 16 and 18 July 2010.

- A Chinese Restaurant
- Blumentopf
- Dúné
- Heaven Shall Burn
- Jochen Distelmeyer
- Love Many Feet
- Männerurlaub
- Skindred
- The Sounds
- Tocotronic
- An Horse
- Danko Jones
- Good Shoes
- Hey Today
- Kafkas
- Martin Jondo
- Ohrbooten
- Subway to Sally
- The Swindle
- Vive La Fete
- Bela B.
- Die Apokalyptischen Reiter
- Grand Avenue
- Itchy Poopzkid
- Leavin' Soho
- Milk feat. Billy Popolus
- Papa Roach
- The Disco Boys
- The Welcome Dynasty
- Wayne Jackson
- Blood Red Shoes
- Digitalism DJ Set
- Grossstadtgeflüster
- Jan Delay & Disko No.1
- Livingston
- Monsters of Liedermaching
- Revolverheld
- The Downfall Ends
- Timid Tiger

=== 2011 ===
Deichbrand took place at Seeflughafen Cuxhaven/Nordholz, near Wanhöden, between the 22 and 24 July 2011.

- Adept
- Blackmail
- Boy Hits Car
- Heaven Shall Burn
- Das Beben
- DJ Thomilla feat. Sante
- Emil Bulls
- In Extremo
- Le Fly
- Pennywise
- The Dreams
- Aura
- Boogee Munstaz
- Broilers
- Die Fantastischen Vier
- Donots
- Frida Gold
- Jennifer Rostock
- Liedfett
- Skunk Anansie
- The Koletzkis
- Wirtz
- Bad Religion
- Boris Dlugosch
- Bullet For My Valentine
- Fotos
- Egotronic
- Ghost of Tom Joad
- Juli
- Milk & Sugar
- Suffocating Sight
- The Love Bülow
- Beige
- Bosse
- Callejon
- Die Happy
- Elektrizzl
- Guano Apes
- Kettcar
- Montreal
- The Bosshoss
- Westbam

=== 2012 ===
The 8th Deichbrand took place between 20 and 22 July 2012, at Seeflughafen Cuxhaven/Nordholz, near Wanhöden.

- Adolar
- Caliban
- Dick Brave & The Backbeats
- Frittenbude
- Immortal Sin
- Ignite
- Kellermensch
- Oomph!
- Samy Deluxe & Band
- The Subways
- Vierkanttretlager
- ASP
- Clueso
- Egotronic
- Fritz Kalkbrenner
- Irie Révoltés
- Lexy & K-Paul
- Regicide
- Sunrise Avenue
- The Koletzkis
- Within Temptation
- Beatsteaks
- D-A-D
- Eisbrecher
- H-Blockx
- Johannes Strate
- Mono Inc.
- Russkaja
- Supershirt
- Turbostaat
- Betontod
- Deichkind
- Fiva & das Phantom Orchester
- Heaven Shall Burn
- Jupiter Jones
- Monsters of Liedermaching
- Saltatio Mortis
- The Sounds
- Turntablerocker

A few gigs such as Frittenbude or Die Orsons on Friday were canceled last-minute because of a damaged stage. The stage was damaged by a cyclone.

=== 2013 ===
The 9th Deichbrand took place between 18 and 21 July 2013, at Seeflughafen Cuxhaven/Nordholz.

- Die Toten Hosen
- Casper
- Broilers
- In Flames
- Kraftklub
- Tocotronic
- Madsen
- Anti-Flag
- Jennifer Rostock
- Royal Republic
- Frittenbude
- H-Blockx
- Bosse
- Frida Gold
- Blumentopf
- Comeback Kid

=== 2018 ===
The 14th Deichbrand took place between 19 and 22 July 2019, at Seeflughafen Cuxhaven/Nordholz. Around 55.000 people attended the festival.

- Die Toten Hosen
- The Killers
- Casper
- Wolfmother
- Clueso
- Amy Macdonald
- Bosse
- Alligatoah
- Mando Diao
- Milky Chance
- Freundeskreis
- Kettcar
- Kontra K
- 257er
- Von wegen Lisbeth
