= Fühlinger See =

Artificial lake in Cologne, Germany

Coordinates: 51.026°N 6.923°E

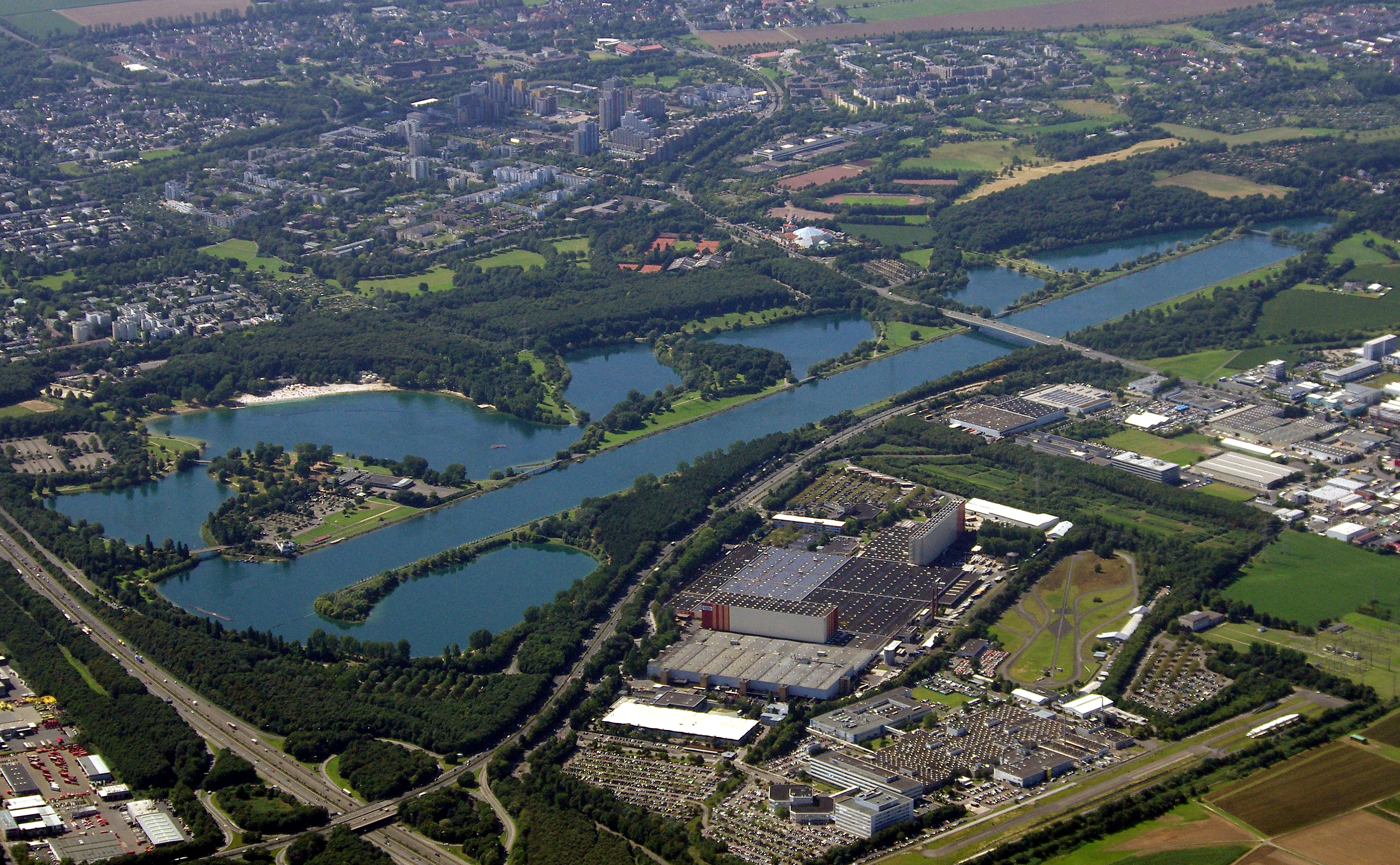
Aerial view of Fühlinger See

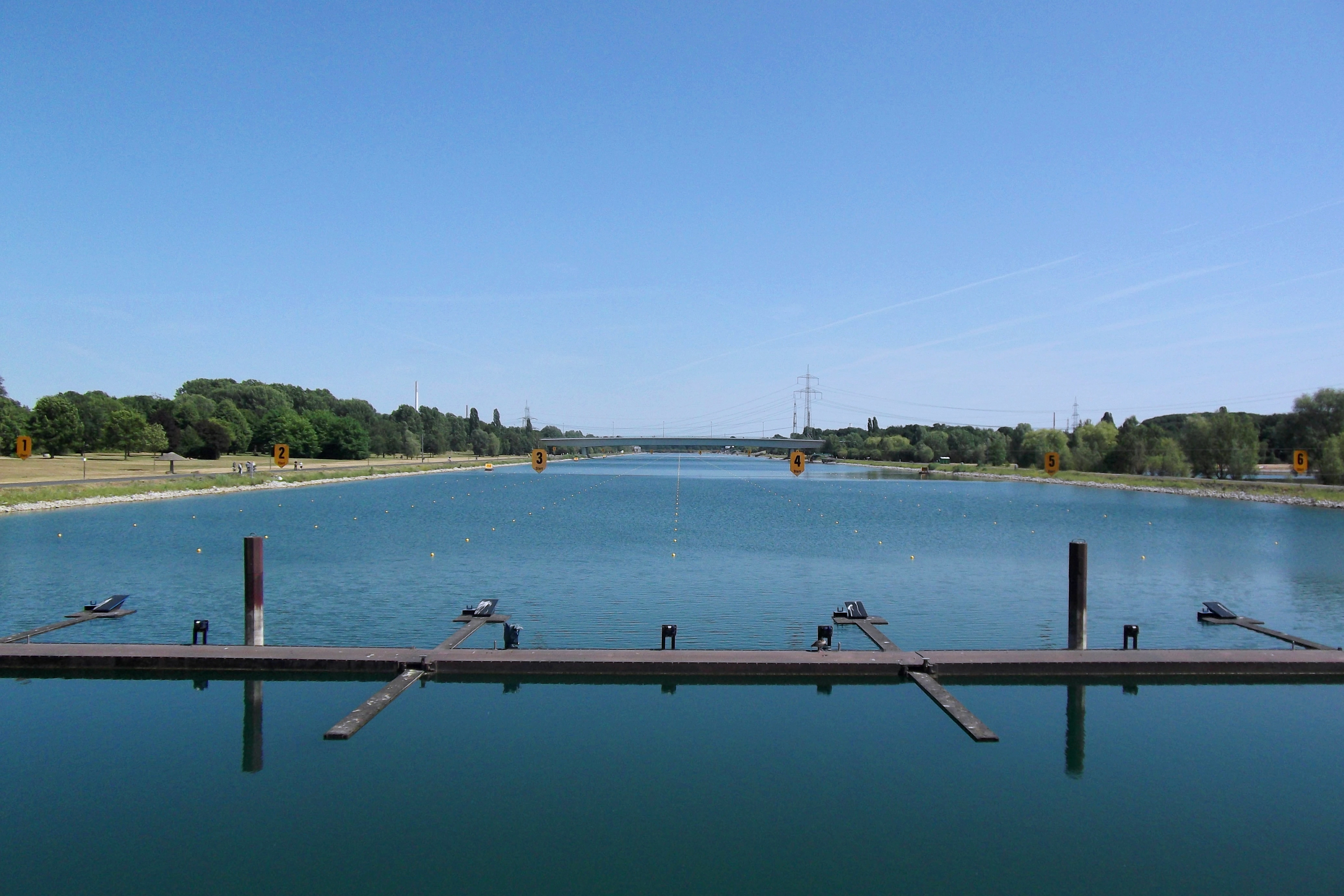
Fühlinger See rowing course

Fühlinger See (German pronunciation: [ˈfyːlɪŋɐ ˈzeː]) is a series of connected lakes in the Cologne suburb of Fühlingen in the German state of North Rhine-Westphalia.

The artificial lake covers an area of 100 hectares (250 acres) and is a major attraction. There are equestrian routes around the lake, and the horse riding club Reiterverein Oranjehof is located nearby. Fühlinger See has an international rowing course, and was the venue for the 1998 World Rowing Championships. Men competed in 14 categories for world titles, whilst there were 10 events for women. Germany came out on top of the medal table.

The lake was created from 1912 when aggregate was excavated; according to the German Wikipedia entry, this was for what are now Bundesautobahn 4 (Aachen–Cologne) and Bundesautobahn 3 (Krefeld–Cologne), but according to a newspaper article from 1935, the fill was used for work on the railway line from Aachen to Cologne (which was indeed widened to four tracks from 1912 onwards). With the river Rhine nearby, the excavated hole quickly filled with water. From the 1930s onwards, people came to the lake to swim while excavations were still going on. In 1967, the lakes were officially turned into a recreation area. A total of seven lakes are interconnected, all grouped around a central rowing facility. The various lakes have different purposes: one is for diving, one for fishing, one for windsurfing, three for boating, and one for rowing. Swimming is only allowed at the private "Blackfoot Beach" area in sea nr. 5 (with entry fee), because the city of cologne fears lawsuits in case of accidents. Since there are structures built in the lakes the administration fears people might think swimming would be under supervision.
