= Oberbayerisches Volksblatt =

German newspaper in Bavaria

- Type: Daily newspaper, 6 issues per week
- Founder(s): Leonhard Lang; Ernst Haenisch
- Publisher: Oliver Döser
- Editor: Willi Börsch
- Founded: October 26, 1945; 80 years ago
- Language: German
- Headquarters: Oberbayerisches Volksblatt GmbH & Co. Medienhaus KG Hafnerstraße 5-13 83022 Rosenheim
- Country: Germany
- Circulation: 58,801 Monday thru Saturday (as of January 2018)
- Website: ovb-online.de

The Oberbayerische Volksblatt, often marketed as OVB, is a regional newspaper. It is the main issue of the OVB-Heimatzeitungen editorial, which also includes the newspaper titles Chiemgau-Zeitung, Mangfall-Bote, Wasserburger Zeitung, Mühldorfer Anzeiger, Waldkraiburger Nachrichten and Neumarkter Anzeiger. The distribution area of OVB-Heimatzeitungen includes city and district of Rosenheim, the district of Mühldorf and the western district of Traunstein.

The publisher of the newspaper as well as its regional editions and headlines is the Oberbayerisches Volksblatt GmbH & Co Medienhaus KG, headquartered in Rosenheim. Managing director is Oliver Döser, whose father Alfons Döser handed over the management on his 65th birthday in 2003.

The sold circulation of the Oberbayerischen Volksblatts amounts to 58.801 copies, a decrease of 22.9 percent since 1998.

== Name ==
The name translates literally as Newspaper of the Upper Bavarian People.

== History ==
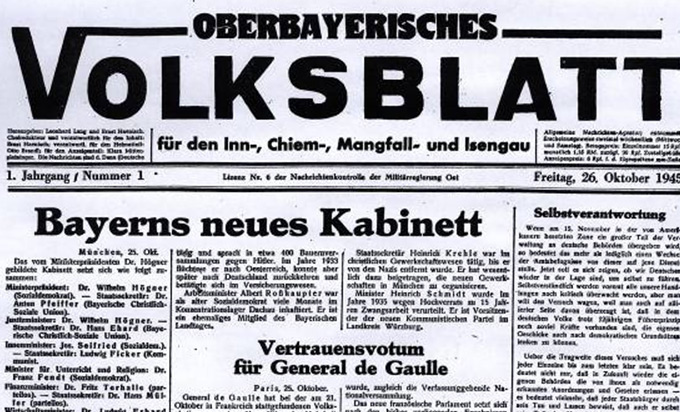
First issue of the Oberbayerisches Volksblatt

After the Second World War, the United States' occupation force in Bavaria wanted to build up a manageable number of medium-sized regional newspapers with higher circulation instead of the small-scale press landscape prevailing until 1945 with numerous local newspapers. In Upper Bavaria, new newspapers were licensed by the U.S. only in Munich, Ingolstadt, Rosenheim, Garmisch-Partenkirchen and Bad Reichenhall. The license for a new newspaper in Rosenheim was awarded to Leonhard Lang and Ernst Haenisch. On October 8, 1945, the new Rosenheimer daily entitled Oberbayerisches Volksblatt was approved by the U.S. military government in Munich. The license referred to the city of Rosenheim and the former districts Rosenheim, Bad Aibling, Wasserburg and Mühldorf. The Oberbayerische Volksblatt, approved with "License No. 6", was the sixth new newspaper in Bavaria. The first issue appeared on October 26, 1945.

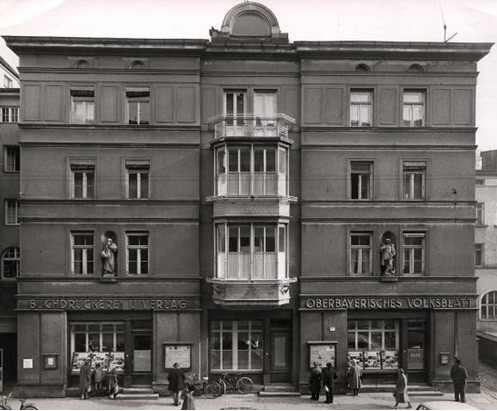
The editorial building on Prinzregenten Street in Rosenheim in the 1950s

The editors and publishers of the new newspaper were based in the publishing house on the Prinzregenten Street, where until May 1945 the Rosenheimer Anzeiger had been produced. This traditional daily newspaper was founded in 1854 by the Munich-based printer Erasmus Huber in Wasserburg as Rosenheimer Wochenblatt. In 1860 he moved the publishing house to Rosenheim, where he renamed the newspaper three years later as Rosenheimer Anzeiger. In 1868 Huber sold the company to Hieronymus Mühlberger and Ludwig Gaßner. In 1871, Catholic-conservative circles founded the Rosenheim Tagblatt Wendelstein as a rival to the Rosenheimer Anzeiger, which fought fierce journalistic battles with its liberal opponent. In the same year, Michael Niedermayr from Altenbeuern acquired the Rosenheimer Anzeiger, which appeared in 1875 as a daily newspaper. Successor of Michael Niedermayr was his son Robert. In 1935, his son Franz entered the publishing house. The Rosenheimer editorial was already fully aligned at this time with the National Socialist party line. The last issue of the Rosenheimer Anzeiger appeared on May 1, 1945.

As of the early third millennium, it was said «The OVB is one of the most widely read local newspapers in Bavaria.»

== Internet presence ==
- ovb online.
- rosenheim24, chiemgau24, wasserburg24, innsalzach24, bgland24, mangfall24.
- rosenheimIMMO, chiemgauIMMO, innsalzachIMMO, bglandIMMO.
- rosenheimJOBS, chiemgauJOBS, innsalzachJOBS, bglandJOBS.
