= Monrose discography =

Cataloging of published recordings by Monrose

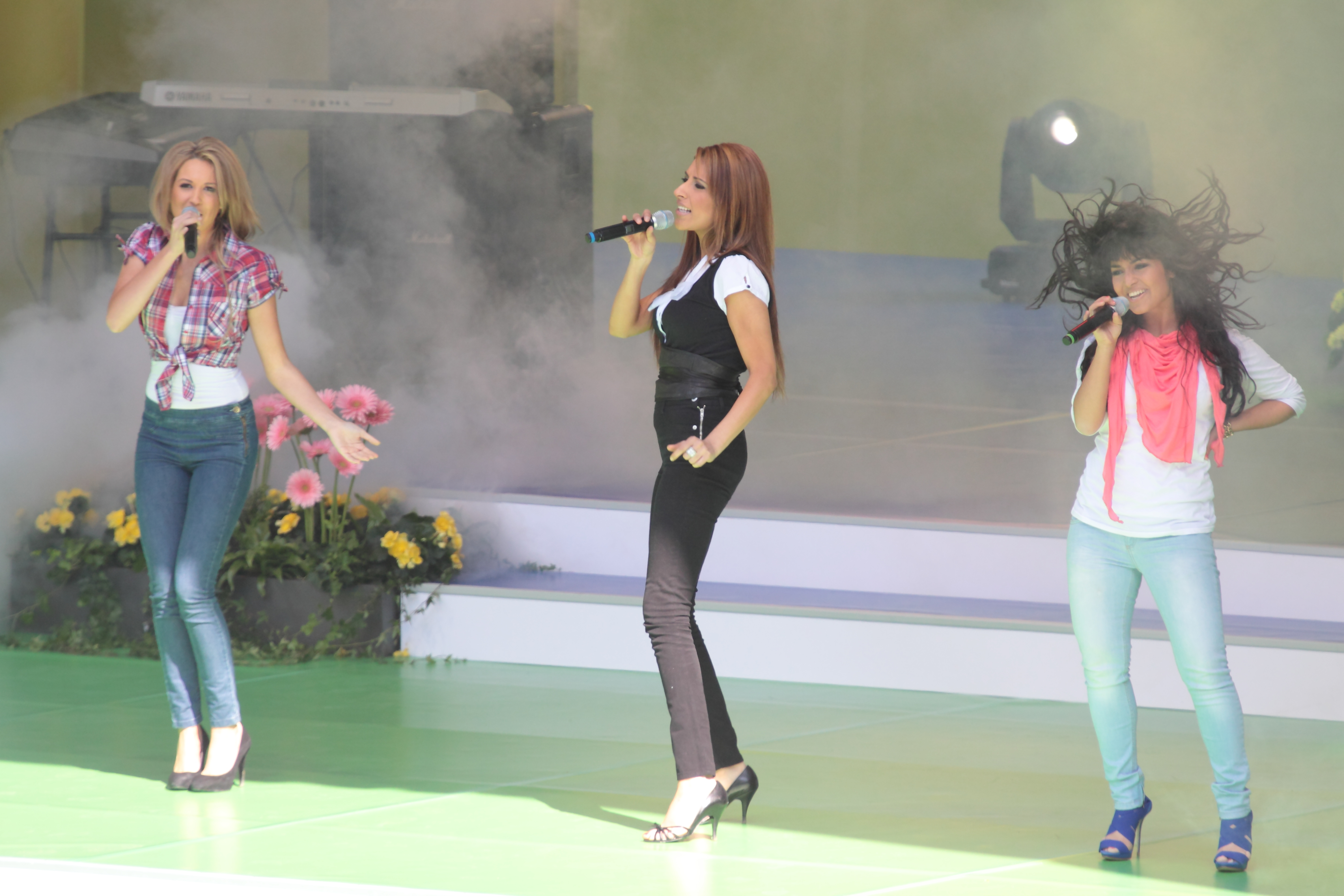
- Capristo, Gammour, and Kizil at the 2009 Bundesgartenschau opening.
- Studio albums: 4
- Extended plays: 1
- Singles: 11
- Video albums: 1
- Music videos: 12

German pop trio Monrose, consisting of singers Mandy Capristo, Senna Gammour, and Bahar Kızıl, was formed in November 2006 after winning Popstars – Neue Engel braucht das Land, the fifth installment of the talent show Popstars. The group released four studio albums and eleven singles until their disbanded in 2010, culminating in four top ten albums, seven top ten hit singles and overall sales in excess of 1.5 million singles and albums.

In December 2006, the band released their debut single "Shame", which reached number-one in Austria, Germany and Switzerland. It was certified triple gold in Germany and became the ninth best-selling single of 2007 in Germany. The group's debut album Temptation was released a week later, topping the charts in Austria, Germany and Switzerland, and was subsequently certified double platinum in Germany for more than 400,000 units shipped. The albums spawned one more single, "Even Heaven Cries", which peaked at number six in Germany.

Their second album Strictly Physical was released in September 2007 and reached number two in Germany. It was certified gold in Germany and Austria. Strictly Physical produced three top ten singles, including the album's title track, the ballad "What You Don't Know" and their second number-one single "Hot Summer" the latter of which was also certified gold in Germany and Austria, and became the fifteenth best-selling single of 2007 in Germany.

The group's third studio album I Am was released in October 2008 throughout German-speaking Europe. It became Monrose's third consecutive top ten album in Germany and produced the top hit "Strike the Match." A fourth studio album, entitled Ladylike, was issued in June 2010. Their fourth album to reach the top ten of the German Albums Chart, it produced their seventh top ten single "Like a Lady." In November 2010, Monrose announced their separation. A third single from Ladylike, titled "Breathe You In", served as their farewell single.

== Studio albums ==
List of albums, with selected chart positions and certifications
Title	Album details	Peak chart positions			Certifications
Title	Album details	GER	AUT	SWI	Certifications
Temptation	Released: December 8, 2006; Label: Starwatch/Warner; Formats: CD, digital download	1	1	1	BVMI: 2× Platinum; IFPI AUT: Platinum; IFPI SWI: Platinum
Strictly Physical	Released: September 21, 2007; Label: Starwatch/Warner; Formats: CD, digital download	2	7	6	BVMI: Gold; IFPI AUT: Gold
I Am	Released: September 26, 2008; Label: Starwatch/Warner; Formats: CD, digital download	9	14	20	
Ladylike	Released: June 11, 2010; Label: Starwatch/Warner; Formats: CD, digital download	10	26	25	
"—" denotes releases that did not chart or were not released.

== EPs ==
List of EPs, with selected details
Title	EP details
Sessions@AOL	Released: March 23, 2007; Label: Starwatch/Warner; Format: Digital download
Gold	Released: September 8, 2023; Label: BMG; Format: Digital download

== Singles ==
List of singles, with selected chart positions and certifications, showing year released and album name
Single	Year	Peak chart positions				Certifications (sales thresholds)	Album
Single	Year	GER	AUT	SWI	EU	Certifications (sales thresholds)	Album
"Shame"	2006	1	1	1	5	BVMI: 3× Gold; IPPI AUT: Gold; IPPI SWI: Gold	Temptation
"Even Heaven Cries"	2007	6	17	19	21		Temptation
"Hot Summer"	2007	1	1	1	6	BVMI: Platinum; IPPI AUT: Gold	Strictly Physical
"Strictly Physical"	2007	6	16	29	24		Strictly Physical
"What You Don't Know"	2007	6	16	34	23	BVMI: Gold	Strictly Physical
"Strike the Match"	2008	10	16	11	34		I Am
"Hit 'n' Run"	2008	16	29	—	55		I Am
"Why Not Us"	2008	27	53	—	89		I Am
"Like a Lady"	2010	9	9	13	43		Ladylike
"This Is Me"	2010	22	28	—	—		Ladylike
"Breathe You in"	2010	60	—	—	—		Ladylike
"—" denotes releases that did not chart or were not released.

== Other appearances ==
List of album appearances
Title	Year	Album
"Wunder gibt es immer wieder"	2007	digital-only release
"We Love"	2008	digital-only release
"Walking Away" (with Craig David)	2009	Greatest Hits
"You Can Look"	2009	Germany's Next Topmodel compilation
"Endlich sehe ich das Licht"	2010	Rapunzel - Neu verföhnt soundtrack

== Videography ==
=== Video albums ===
List of video albums, with selected details, showing year released and certifications
Title	DVD details	Certification
Popstars – The Making of Monrose	Released: 2006; Label: Starwatch/Warner; Format: DVD	GER: Gold; AUT: Gold

=== Music videos ===
Title	Year	Director(s)
"Shame"	2006	Oliver Sommer
"Even Heaven Cries"	2007	Katja Kuhl
"Hot Summer"	2007	Bernard Wedig
"Strictly Physical"	2007	Oliver Sommer
"What You Don't Know"	2007	Markus Gerwinat
"Strike the Match"	2008	Oliver Sommer
"Hit'n'Run"	2008	Bernard Wedig
"Why Not Us"	2008	Markus Gerwinat
"Walking Away" (with Craig David)	2009	Markus Gerwinat
"Like a Lady"	2010	Thomas Job
"This Is Me"	2010	Lennart Brede
"Endlich seh' ich das Licht"	2010	—N/a
"Breathe You in"	2010	—N/a
