= Temptation (Monrose album) =

Studio album by Monrose
- Released: 8 December 2006
- Recorded: October–November 2006
- Studio: Weryton Studios (Munich)
- Genre: R&B; pop
- Length: 45:29
- Label: Starwatch; Cheyenne; Warner
- Producer: Bobbybass; Marcus Brosch; Toni Cottura; Dieter Falk; Jonas Jeberg; Jiant; Marc Mozart; J. Remy; Snowflakers

Monrose chronology
Temptation (2006)	Strictly Physical (2007)

Singles from Temptation
- 1. "Shame" Released: 1 December 2006; 2. "Even Heaven Cries" Released: 2 March 2007

Temptation is the debut studio album by German girl band Monrose. It was released by Starwatch Music on 8 December 2006 in German-speaking Europe, following the band's formation on Popstars – Neue Engel braucht das Land, the television talent show's fifth season. Pre-recorded with all six Popstars finalists throughout October and November 2006, the majority of the album was produced by Popstars jury member Dieter Falk. Additional collaborators include Jiant, Jonas Jeberg, Toni Cottura and Mozart & Friends.

Upon its release, Temptation became an instant smash hit. One of the most successful debuts of the year, it debuted on top of the charts in Austria, Germany and Switzerland, and reached Platinum status in Germany its first week of release. It was eventually certified Double Platinum by the Bundesverband Musikindustrie (BVMI) and went Platinum in both Austria and Switzerland. In Austria, Temptation became one of the ten biggest-selling albums of 2007. In Germany, it was ranked 14th.

The album was preceded by the number-one hit single "Shame," which emerged as the most-downloaded track since the introduction of the legal digital download charts in Germany up to then well as one of the ninth best-selling single of 2007. Second single "Even Heaven Cries" served as Monrose's competition song on Der deutsche Vorentscheid 2007 – Wer singt für Deutschland?, the German national final show of the 52nd Eurovision Song Contest 2007, where it eventually placed second.

== Recording ==
Temptation was recorded between October and November 2006, mainly at the Weryton Studios in Munich. With the final three members of the band not yet chosen, Starwatch Music arranged for each of the six finalists of Popstars – Neue Engel braucht das Land to lay down vocals for all songs that were expected to appear on the album in order to be able to mix proper versions immediately after the finale on 23 November 2006. Thus, the vocals of runner-ups Romina Reinhardt, Katarzyna "Kati" Zinkiewicz and Arjeta "Ari" Zuta were left unused after the election of Senna Gammour, Bahar Kızıl and Mandy Capristo.

Popstars jury member Dieter Falk and co-producing partner Derek von Krogh as well as British duo Jiant contributed most to the album. The contestants also worked with German producers Marcus Brosch, Toni Cottura, and Marc Mozart and his Mozart & Friends team, Danish songwriter and music producer Jonas Jeberg as well as Jeremy "JRemy" Skaller and Robert "Bobbybass" Larow from American production team Orange Factory Music. British duo Snowflakers also worked on the album. Songwriters on Temptation include Edwin "Lil' Eddie" Serrano, Gary Barlow, Eliot Kennedy, Niara Scarlett, Lauren Evans, Alex James, Thara Prashad, Robbie Nevil, and Eritza Laues.

== Critical reception ==
Professional ratings
Review scores
Source	Rating
CDStarts	4/10 stars
laut.de	3/5 stars
LetMeEntertainYou	2/5 stars
Wooodz	4/5

Temptation earned generally mixed to positive reviews from music critics. laut.de editor Stefan Johannesberg called the trio the "new Destiny's Dolls or Pussycat Childs." He wrote that "the three voices and their hearts and souls are two of the most important components on this good album. Games, fun and sex squirt out of every reel, because R&B music is exactly their sound" and further complimented the vocal performances on Temptation: "Senna and Bahar torch the clubs sometimes aggressively, sometimes frivolously" while Mandy's "monster of a voice gets goosebumps vibrating in the best X-Tina or Mariah manner." Pointer felt that "Monrose's music is authentic and trendy with a sound reminiscent of the Sugababes."

Wooodz described Temptation as a "balanced mix of pop and R&B songs, but it's the ballads that are the most touching." The online magazined found that the vocal performances of trio transform the album "into a treasure trove of little treasures – even if they often only reveal themselves as such on the second listen." Less impressed, Albert Ranner from CDStarts called Temptation a "wasted chance" as well as "a declaration of bankruptcy in which the three girls are sold below their value." He found that the album was an "unnecessary disparagement of the authenticity of the trio [...] mainly due to heavy copying of American R&B artists such as Christina Milian, Jennifer Lopez or the work of a younger Mariah Carey." LetMeEntertainYou wrote that "if you let them, the girls can sing quite well. But with average pop songs like "No," "Work It" and "Live Life Get By," however, this becomes an absolutely secondary matter.

== Chart performance ==
Following its physical release, Temptation immediately debuted at number-one of the albums charts in Austria, Germany and Switzerland, making it one of the most successful debuts of the year. The album was instantly certified platinum for more than 200,000 copies sold within its first week of release, and as of June 2007, has been certified three-time platinum for more than 400,000 copies sold worldwide. It was eventually ranked 17th on the German Media Control year-end charts.

Although "Do That Dance" was planned to be released as the album's third single at times, Temptation has spawned two singles only: The album's lead single, "Shame", reached number-one in Austria, Germany, Luxembourg and Switzerland, making it one of the most successful debuts of the year. Outselling 3/4 of the German Top 100's singles sales combined, the song also emerged as the fastest selling CD single of 2006 and the biggest downloaded song since 2004. Follow-up single "Even Heaven Cries" was released in early March 2007 and moreover used as the band's competition song in the Eurovision Song Contest 2007 pre-selection show Deutscher Vorentscheid 2007. While it reached the top 10 in Germany, the song also peaked within the top 20 in Austria, and Switzerland.

== Track listing ==
Temptation track listing
No.	Title	Writer(s)	Producer(s)	Length
1.	"Shame" (Radio Edit)	Tim Hawes; Pete Kirtley; Christian Ballard; Andrew Murray	Jiant; Snowflakers	3:29
2.	"Even Heaven Cries"	Robbie Nevil; Philip Denker; Lauren Evans; Jonas Jeberg; Jens Lumholt	Jeberg	3:56
3.	"Oh La La"	Hawes; Kirtley; Obi Mhondera; Major	Jiant; Major^{[B]}	3:46
4.	"No"	Holly James; Tim Goodacre; Stuart Roslyn	Dieter Falk; Derek von Krogh^{[A]}	2:58
5.	"I'm Gonna Freak Ya"	Winston Sela; Roberto Martorell; Nanna Martorell	Marcus Brosch; Toni Cottura	3:27
6.	"Love Don't Come Easy"	Cottura; Brosch; Kim Zebrowski; Inessa Alessandrova	Falk; von Krogh^{[A]}	4:38
7.	"2 of a Kind"	Gary Barlow; Eliot Kennedy; Tim Woodcock	Falk; von Krogh^{[A]}; Marc Mozart^{[A]}; J. Worthy^{[A]}	3:12
8.	"Your Love Is Right Over Me"	T. B. Andrews	Falk; von Krogh^{[A]}	4:35
9.	"Work It"	Anthony Little; Richard Kelly	Falk; von Krogh^{[A]}	3:54
10.	"Do That Dance"	Claude-Michel Schönberg; Alain Boublil; Richard Maltby	Jiant; Major^{[B]}	3:26
11.	"Live Life Get By"	Jonathan Shorten; Niara Scarlett	Jiant; Snowflakers	3:57
12.	"Push Up on Me"	Jeremy Skaller; Robert Larrow; Thara Prashad; Edwin Serrano; George Adamas; Eritza Laues	Bobbybass; Mozart; JRemy	4:03

Musicload bonus tracks
No.	Title	Writer(s)	Producer(s)	Length
13.	"Butt Butt"	Jasmine Baird; Alex James	Jiant	3:01

Notes

- ^{^[A]} denotes co-producer
- ^{^[B]} denotes additional producer

Sample credits

- "Oh La la" is a cover version of the same-titled 2005 song by British duo Boo2.
- "Do That Dance" is an English remake of Kay Cee Dee's 2006 song "Bad Boy."
- "Push Up on Me" is a cover version of Thara and Rupee's previously unreleased recording from 2006.

== Credits and personnel ==
Credits adapted from the liner notes of Temptation.

Performers and musicians

- Dieter Falk – piano
- Marc Mozart – keyboard
- G-Strings – strings
- Ossi Schaller – guitar

Technical

- Christian Ballard – mixing
- Bobbybass – producer
- Marcus Brosch – producer, programming
- Copenhaniacs – programming
- Toni Cottura – producer
- Tom Dokoupil – engineer
- Dieter Falk – producer
- Tara Harrison – vocal assistance
- Tim Hawes – mixing
- Pete Kirtley – mixing
- Sven Kohlwage – mixing
- Derek von Krogh – mixing, producer, programming
- Jonas Jeberg – mixing, producer
- Jiant – producer
- Major – producer
- Obi Mhondera – vocal assistance
- Mark Mozart – producer, programming
- J. Remy – producer
- Niara Scarlett – vocal assistance
- Snowflakers – producer
- Ren Swan – mixing
- Christoph Terbuyken – engineer
- J. Worthy – producer, programming

== Charts ==
=== Weekly charts ===
Weekly chart performance for Temptation
Chart (2006)	Peak position
Austrian Albums (Ö3 Austria)	1
European Top 100 Albums (Billboard)	5
German Albums (Offizielle Top 100)	1
Swiss Albums (Schweizer Hitparade)	1

=== Year-end charts ===
Year-end chart performance for 20
Chart (2006–07)	Position
Austrian Albums (Ö3 Austria)	9
German Albums (Offizielle Top 100)	14
Swiss Albums (Schweizer Hitparade)	45

== Certifications and sales ==
Certifications of Temptation, with sales where available
Region	Certification	Certified units/sales
Austria (IFPI Austria)	Platinum	30,000^{*}
Germany (BVMI)	2× Platinum	400,000^{^}
Switzerland (IFPI Switzerland)	Platinum	30,000^{^}
^{*} Sales figures based on certification alone.^{^} Shipments figures based on certification alone.

== Release history ==
Temptation release history
Country	Date	Edition	Format	Label	Ref.
Austria	8 December 2006	Standard	CD; digital download	Starwatch; Cheyenne; Warner	
Germany	8 December 2006	Standard	CD; digital download	Starwatch; Cheyenne; Warner	
Switzerland	8 December 2006	Standard	CD; digital download	Starwatch; Cheyenne; Warner	
