= We Love =

Single by Monrose
- Released: 20 March 2008
- Recorded: 2007 at the Mövenpick Hotel in Berlin, Germany
- Genre: Pop
- Length: 3:07 (single version)
- Label: Starwatch
- Songwriter(s): Alexander Gernert, Manuel Loyo, Alexander Hahn, Alexander Krause
- Producer(s): Marc Mozart, Alexander Hahn

Monrose singles chronology
"What You Don't Know" (2007)	"We Love" (2008)	"Strike the Match" (2008)

"We Love" (also known as "We Love to Entertain You") is the theme song for the Star Force image campaign of German television network ProSieben. Several variations of the song have been interpreted by various stars, including Melanie C, Sarah Connor, The Pussycat Dolls and Take That. In 2008, German girl band Monrose recorded their own version of the song, produced by Mozart & Friends, which was released as a digital download single on 20 March 2008 (see 2008 in music).

== Writing and recording ==
Penned by Mozart & Friends writers Alexander Gernert, Manuel Loyo, Alexander Hahn and Alexander Krause, commissioned "We Love" was written and composed in a single week, since the song was needed for a video shooting Monrose had already been booked for at the Hangar 7 in Salzburg, Austria. The track was produced by Hahn and team head Marc Mozart, who said "it was extremely fun to work on this production [...] A&R executives Markus Hartmann and Stefan Harder of ProSieben's music department Starwatch trusted that we'd come up with a hot song, so we enjoyed both a lot of creative freedom while being under the pressure of a short deadline."

Since the band wws rehearsing for upcoming gigs in Berlin, the team had only a few hours to record their vocals for "We Love" and since there was no time to book a studio, handle the logistics of driving the singers to the studio, they decided to book a room in the Mövenpick Hotel where the girls stayed. "We set up some equipment, including a special kind of portable vocal booth called the Reflexion Filter and as expected, Monrose delivered a top performance," said Mozart, who used two Apple computers running Logic Pro for recording and editing. Producer J. Worthy finished a clubmix of "We Love" and added drumsounds to the main version that now airs in many commercial breaks of the network.

== Music video ==
The song's music video clip, actually a Pro7-commercial, is only 41 seconds long and premiered at February 2008 on ProSieben and features only Senna Gammour's rap, the chorus and ends with the Pro7 theme music. At the beginning you see Senna, Bahar and Mandy exit a "WE LOVE"-vehicle and sing in front of microphones.

The "ProSieben remix" or "Starforce-mix" of the video features cameos of Heidi Klum, Uri Geller, Bully Herbig, Stefan Raab, Christoph Maria Herbst and many others. The video, actually not being a music video, has not received airplay by music channels.

== Formats and track listings ==
These are the formats and track listings of major single-releases of "We Love."

=== Digital single ===
1. "We Love" (Mozart & Friends radio mix) – 3:07
2. "We Love" (J. Worthy club mix) – 3:31
