= Even Heaven Cries =

Single by Monrose

from the album Temptation
- Released: 2 March 2007
- Recorded: Weryton Studios (Munich)
- Length: 3:56
- Label: Starwatch; Warner
- Songwriters: Philip Denker; Lauren Evans; Jonas Jeberg; Jens Lumholt; Robbie Nevil
- Producer: Jonas Jeberg

Monrose singles chronology
"Shame" (2006)	"Even Heaven Cries" (2007)	"Hot Summer" (2007)

"Even Heaven Cries" is a song by all-female German pop trio Monrose. It was written by Robbie Nevil, Jens Lumholt, Lauren Evans, Philip Denker, and Jonas Jeberg and recorded for the band's debut studio album, Temptation (2006), while production was overseen by Jeberg. Built upon a boom clap percussion and a strummed-harp sample, reminiscent of other Jeberg productions, the sentimental midtempo R&B ballad contains lyrics about personality and body-image issues as well as self-esteem and insecurity.

The song was released as the album's second single on 2 March 2007 in German-speaking Europe and reached the top ten in Germany and the top 20 in Austria and Switzerland. It also served as Monrose's competition song on Der deutsche Vorentscheid 2007 – Wer singt für Deutschland?, the German national final show of the 52nd Eurovision Song Contest 2007, where it eventually placed second with a total of 20 per cent of all 900,000 phone votes, eventually losting to singer Roger Ciceros "Frauen regier'n die Welt."

== Background ==
Commissioned by the band's A&R manager Nik Hafemann, "Even Heaven Cries" was one of the first songs on Temptation to be recorded by all six finalists of Popstars – Neue Engel braucht das Land during the album's recording sessions in late October 2006. An early draft of the song was premiered by subsequent band member Mandy Capristo and finalists Katarzyna "Kati" Zinkiewicz and Romina Reinhardt in a one-time live version, specially-produced for the penultimate episode of the Popstars series on 16 November 2006; however, this version featured different ad-libs and vocal harmonies from the one on the album.

Written by American singers Robbie Nevil and Lauren Evans and Danish musicians Philip Denker, Jens Lumholt, and Jonas Jeberg, "Even Heaven Cries" was produced by Jeberg. Monrose have described the R&B ballad as one of the "most sentimental" records on Temptation: "'Even Heaven Cries' is pure emotion and has always been one of our favourites on the album", Mandy Capristo said in an interview with the band's official website. "This emotional ballad has still become more pathetic through its overwork." Senna Gammour called the song a personal concern: "It [the song] is a notice to signify to yourself! And that's so absolutely us!"

== Chart performance ==
Although "Even Heaven Cries" was not officially released as a physical or digital single until 2 March 2007, it debuted at number nine on the German Download Chart in the week of 22 December 2006, based solely on strong digital download sales after the release of parent album Temptation (2006) and heavy promotion during the final episodes of Popstars – Neue Engel braucht das Land on 23 November 2006. Issued to radio stations in Austria, Germany, and Switzerland in February 2007, the song made its debut at number 36 on the German Airplay Chart in the week ending 9 March 2007. However, it took another four weeks, until it reached its peak position of number 16 in the week ending 30 March 2007.

In the week of 16 March 2007, "Even Heaven Cries" debuted at number seven on German Singles Chart, becoming Monrose's second top ten hit. It also entered both the Austrian and the Swiss Singles Chart at number 19. The following week, after Monrose's live performance of the song on the national final Der deutsche Vorentscheid 2007 – Wer singt für Deutschland? on 8 March 2007, "Even Heaven Cries" jumped one spot to number six in Germany and peaked at number 17 in Austria. The same week, the song peaked at number five on Billboard's European Hot 100 Singles chart. While it was significantly less successful than previous single "Shame," GfK Entertainment ranked the song 75th on the German year-end singles chart.

== Music video ==
Mandy, Senna and Bahar inside an animated glass globe in the music video for "Even Heaven Cries" (2007).

A music video for "Even Heaven Cries" was directed by Katja Kuhl and filmed in Berlin-Spandau in early February 2007. It officially worldpremiered on 22 February on the band's official website, and received its first official airing on the German music television channel VIVA on 23 February. The video, however, was not included into its music video rotation since Popstars broadcaster ProSieben wanted to promote the official video premiere with the start of second cycle of Germany's Next Topmodel on 1 March – almost one week after its initial first airing.

The video shows Monrose in a flowery garden, Bahar Kızıl sitting on a swing while Senna Gammour is standing in front of a cherry tree and Mandy Capristo is shown sitting on a bench. Scenes of two harassed women and one father whose son smudged his apartment with yellow paint are cut in. They seem to despair but then the garden in which Monrose are placed turns out to be a glass globe that encourages the three tormented. The music video plays with two heavy contrasted worlds: On the one hand the glass globe which shows a gaudy fairylike dreamland but on the other hand the grey, drab, depressing world where injustice and grief happens. However the video attempts to convey what the song's lyrics say: There are always ups and downs in life you just have to be loyal to yourself and everything will become fine again.

== Wer singt für Deutschland? ==
On 20 December 2006, only weeks after the band's formation on Popstars – Neue Engel braucht das Land, Norddeutscher Rundfunk (NDR) reported that Monrose would participate in Der deutsche Vorentscheid 2007 – Wer singt für Deutschland?, the German pre-selection for the 52nd Eurovision Song Contest 2007 in Helsinki, Finland. In January 2007, it was announced that either ballads "Your Love Is Right Over Me" and "Even Heaven Cries" or uptempo track "Push Up on Me" would be the next single from Temptation, with Starwatch starting a poll asking the fans to decide. "Even Heaven Cries" eventually finished first with 47% of all votes and was chosen as the group's second single as well as the band's competition song.

To get a better result than the under deadline pressure mixed album version, the trio re-entered recording studios with producer Thorsten Brötzmann to re-record several parts of "Even Heaven Cries." With a length of three minutes and fifty-six seconds on its initial release, the song was also shortened to two minutes and fifty-seven seconds to comply with Eurovision's contest rules and to enable Monrose's participation. Brötzmann's re-arranged 2007 version was premiered on ProSieben prime time boxing show ProSieben Fight Night on 16 February 2007. The televised final of the pre-selection took place on 8 March 2007 at the Deutsches Schauspielhaus in Hamburg, hosted by Thomas Hermanns. Three acts competed during the show with the winner being selected through a public televote. Monrose eventually placed second with a total of 20 per cent of all 900,000 phone votes, eventually losting to singer Roger Cicero and his song "Frauen regier'n die Welt."

== Track listings ==
CD single
No.	Title	Writer(s)	Producer(s)	Length
1.	"Even Heaven Cries" (Single Version 2007)	Philip Denker; Lauren Evans; Jonas Jeberg; Jens Lumholt; Robbie Nevil	Jeberg; Thorsten Brötzmann^{[a]}	2:57
2.	"Diamonds and Pearls"	Vincent DeGiorgio; Tony Malm	Malm; J. Worthy; Marc Mozart	3:36
3.	"Butt Butt"	Jasmine Baird; Alex James	Marcus Brosch; Toni Cottura	3:01
4.	"Even Heaven Cries" (Jeo Mix)	Denker; Evans; Jeberg; Lumholt; Nevil	Jeberg; Joachim "JEO" Mezei^{[a]}	2:55
5.	"Even Heaven Cries" (2007 instrumental)	Denker; Evans; Jeberg; Lumholt; Nevil	Jeberg; Brötzmann^{[a]}	2:56

Digital single
No.	Title	Writer(s)	Producer(s)	Length
1.	"Even Heaven Cries" (Single Version 2007)	Denker; Evans; Jeberg; Lumholt; Nevil	Jeberg; Brötzmann^{[a]}	2:57
3.	"Butt Butt"	Jasmine Baird; Alex James	Marcus Brosch; Toni Cottura	3:01
4.	"Even Heaven Cries" (Jeo Mix)	Denker; Evans; Jeberg; Lumholt; Nevil	Jeberg; Joachim "JEO" Mezei^{[a]}	2:55

Notes

- ^{^[a]} denotes remix producer(s)

== Credits and personnel ==
Credits adapted from the liner notes of Temptation.

- Thorsten Brötzmann – production (single version)
- Mandy Capristo – vocals
- Philip Denker – writing
- Lauren Evans – writing
- Senna Gammour – vocals
- Jonas Jeberg – instruments, mixing, production, writing
- Bahar Kizil – vocals
- Jens Lumholt – writing
- Claudia Macias – artwork
- Robbie Nevil – writing

== Charts ==
=== Weekly charts ===
Weekly chart performance for "Even Heaven Cries"
Chart (2007)	Peak position
Austria (Ö3 Austria Top 40)	17
European Hot 100 Singles (Billboard)	5
Germany (GfK)	6
Switzerland (Schweizer Hitparade)	19

=== Year-end charts ===
Year-end chart performance for "Even Heaven Cries"
Chart (2007)	Rank
Germany (Official German Charts)	75

== Release history ==
Release dates and formats for "Even Heaven Cries"
Region	Date	Format	Label	Edition(s)	Ref
Various	8 December 2006	CD maxi single; digital download	Starwatch Music; Warner	Album version	
Various	2 March 2007	CD maxi single; digital download	Starwatch Music; Warner	Single version	
