= Lauren Evans =

American singer (born 1983)

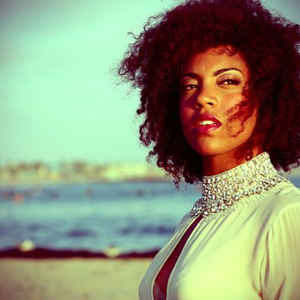

Background information
- Born: Lauren Krista Evans; February 3, 1983 (age 43)
- Origin: Los Angeles, US
- Genres: Pop; Latin; rock; jazz; R&B
- Occupations: Singer, songwriter
- Instrument: voice
- Years active: 1997–present
- Label: Perspective

Lauren Evans (born February 3, 1983) is an American singer and platinum-selling songwriter. She is an ASCAP Award Winner and has written hit singles for Alexandra Burke, Monrose, Jordin Sparks, and Camila.

== Early life ==
Evans grew up in San Bernardino, California, the daughter of a pastor, John Evans, of Promise Keepers and Maranatha! Music, a Christian record label for which she has recorded several popular songs. Evans' cover of "You're Worthy of My Praise" became an oft-played radio hit for the label.

== Career ==
Lauren's music career got an early start from working with production duo Buster & Shavoni who featured her on DreamWorks' The Prince of Egypt soundtrack under the pseudonym Christian. "Didn't I", co-written by Evans, earned her a 1999 Stellar Award nomination for Contemporary Female Vocalist of the Year. Collaborating with producer Rex Rideout, another of her compositions "Brighter Days" was featured in the 2003 film The Fighting Temptations.

Evans has also made her success on TV, contributing her vocals featured on Disney Channel projects such as That's So Raven, The Cheetah Girls, High School Musical, Jump In, Cory in the House. Lauren was also the singing voice behind 4KidsTV's animated series Bratz. Lauren's work on the series was released in 2006 as the compilation album Bratz: Genie Magic on Hip-O/Universal Music.

Over the years, Evans also became an in-demand session vocalist appearing on recordings by Yolanda Adams, Natasha Bedingfield, Corbin Bleu, Boney James, Will Downing, Mick Fleetwood, Heather Headley, Chaka Khan, The Isley Brothers, Ledisi, Latoya London, Barry Manilow, Nicole C. Mullen, Mýa, Ruben Studdard, Paul Taylor, Luther Vandross, Vanessa Williams, Charlie Wilson and the soundtrack of High School Musical 2. In 2022, she supported Tears for Fears on stage in the US.

To date, Evans has made her biggest impact to date as a songwriter. Several songs wrote for the NBC soap opera Passions led to two Emmy Award nominations for Evans. She has also worked with producers such as Robbie Nevil, will.i.am, Rex Rideout, Jimmy Jam & Terry Lewis, Rodney "Darkchild" Jerkins, J.R. Rotem and others.

Evans co-wrote the hit single "One Step at a Time" for American Idol season 6 winner Jordin Sparks, which was a Top-20 hit in the United States, United Kingdom, Australia, Canada and New Zealand. She has also scored worldwide hits with German pop trio Monrose's "Even Heaven Cries" (which peaked the Top 10 on the Official German Charts) and British X Factor winner Alexandra Burke's "Bad Boys"; which hit No. 1 on the Official UK Charts and went on to be nominated for 'Best British Single' at the 2010 BRIT Awards, as well as receiving a Platinum certification by the BPI.

== Awards and nominations ==
=== Stellar Awards ===
The Stellar Awards is a Gospel Music Awards in the U.S., honoring Gospel Music artists, writers, and industry professionals. Chicago based production company Central City Productions Inc. spearheaded by founder, chairman & CEO Don Jackson, has produced the show since its inception in 1985.

Year	Nominee / work	Award	Result
1999	Lauren Evans (Credited as 'Christian')	Contemporary Female Vocalist of The Year	Nominated

=== Daytime Emmy Awards ===
The Daytime Emmy Award is an American accolade bestowed by the New York–based National Academy of Television Arts and Sciences in recognition of excellence in American daytime television programming.

Year	Nominee / work	Award	Result
2004	"Momma, Gotta Let Her Go" (Passions)	Outstanding Original Song	Nominated
2004	"Last Piece of My Heart" (Passions)	Outstanding Original Song	Nominated

=== BRIT Awards ===
The BRIT Awards (sometimes stylised as the BRIT Awards; often simply called the Brits) are the British Phonographic Industry's annual pop music awards.

Year	Nominee / work	Award	Result
2010	"Bad Boys" (Alexandra Burke)	Best British Single	Nominated

=== Latin Grammy Awards ===
A Latin Grammy Award is an award by The Latin Academy of Recording Arts & Sciences to recognize outstanding achievement in the Latin music industry. The Latin Grammy honors works produced anywhere around the world that were recorded in either Spanish or Portuguese and is awarded in the United States.

Year	Nominee / work	Award	Result
2014	"Decidiste Dejarme" (Camila)	Song of The Year	Nominated

=== Billboard Latin Music Awards ===
The Billboard Latin Music Awards grew out of the Billboard Music Awards program from Billboard magazine, an industry publication charting the sales and radio airplay success of musical recordings. The Billboard awards are the Latin music industry's longest running and most prestigious award.

Year	Nominee / work	Award	Result
2015	"Decidiste Dejarme" (Camila)	Latin Pop Song of The Year	Nominated

=== ASCAP Latin Music Awards ===
The American Society of Composers, Authors and Publishers (ASCAP) is an American not-for-profit performance-rights organization (PRO) that protects its members' musical copyrights by monitoring public performances of their music, whether via a broadcast or live performance, and compensating them accordingly. ASCAP honors its top members in a series of annual awards shows in seven music categories: pop, rhythm and soul, film and television, Latin, country, Christian, and concert music.

Year	Nominee / work	Award	Result
2015	"Decidiste Dejarme" (Camila)	Pop Category	Won

== Discography ==
- 2024: Affirmations: Book 1

=== Guest features ===
Below is a list of songs that feature Lauren Evans as lead vocalist.

- 1999: Lauren Evans (credited as Christian) – "Didn't I"
- 2003: Maranatha! Music – "You're Worthy of My Praise”
- 2003: Lauren Evans (credited as Char) - "Girlfriend"
- 2005: The Avila Brothers – "Play For Me”
- 2005: Paul Taylor – "Anything You Say”
- 2006: Andrae Crouch – "Yes Lord”
- 2007: Paul Taylor – "A Love of Your Own”
- 2009: The Latin Project – "Onda”
- 2010: Mike Phillips – "Time of Your Life”
- 2014: Armin van Buuren – "Alone"
- 2015: Elektrik Hearts – "Maybe Tonight"
- 2015: Shaan – "Light up the world"
- 2016: Antillas & Alpha Force – "The Love"
- 2018: Black Eyed Peas – Get Ready

=== Songwriting credits ===
Below is a selective list of songs written or co-written by Lauren Evans.

Year	Song	Artist	Album
1999	Didn't I	Christian	The Prince of Egypt (Inspirational)
2004	Unexpectedly	Maysa	Smooth Sailing
2006	Shine	Boney James	Shine
2007	Even Heaven Cries	Monrose	Temptation
2007	Long Distance Relationship	Paul Taylor	Ladies' Choice
2008	One Step at a Time	Jordin Sparks	Jordin Sparks
2008	No Man, No Cry	Kelly Rowland	Ms. Kelly: Diva Deluxe
2008	Take Control	Jeff Lorber	Heard That
2008	This Anchor Holds	Fady Maalouf	Blessed
2009	Bad Boys	Alexandra Burke	Overcome
2009	Breathless	Vanessa Williams	The Real Thing
2010	Strobelight	Kimberley Locke	Non-album Single
2010	Dream Awake	Jennifer Rush	Now Is the Hour
2010	Just This Way	Jennifer Rush	Now Is the Hour
2010	Fingerprint	Charice	Charice
2010	Tempted By Your Touch	Joana Zimmer	Miss JZ
2010	Time of My Life	Mike Phillips	M.P.3
2011	Free	Mandisa	What If We Were Real
2011	Sleepwalking	Howie D.	Back to Me
2011	In Your Own World	Dionne Bromfield	Good for the Soul
2011	Limbo (leak)	JoJo	Jumping Trains (unreleased)
2011	Light Me Up	KeKe Wyatt	Unbelievable
2012	Mr. Supafly	KeKe Wyatt	R&B Divas
2012	Chains	Chris Rene	I'm Right Here
2013	Did I Lose You	Giorgia & Olly Murs	Senza paura (Giorgia album), Right Place Right Time (Olly Murs album)
2014	I'm So Excited	Anja Nissen	Non-album Single
2014	Alone	Armin Van Buuren	Intense
2014	Decidiste Dejarme	Camila	Elypse
2014	Hey Boy	Goapele	Strong As Glass
2014	Powerful	Goapele	Strong As Glass
2014	My Love	Goapele	Strong As Glass
2014	This Little Light	Jennifer McGill	Jennifer McGill
2016	Glory to Glory	Bethel Music	Have It All
2017	Come Along	Asia Monet	Non-Album Single
2017	Cuando Gane la Distancia	Alejandro Fernández	Rompiendo Fronteras
2018	Mistakes	Influence Music	Touching Heaven
2018	Constant Pt. 1 & 2	Black Eyed Peas	Masters of the Sun Vol. 1
2018	Get Ready	Black Eyed Peas	Masters of the Sun Vol. 1
2018	Even More	MAJOR.	Even More

== See also ==
- Jim Jonsin production discography
- Dapo Torimiro
