= Martin Tingvall =

Swedish jazz pianist and composer (born 1974)

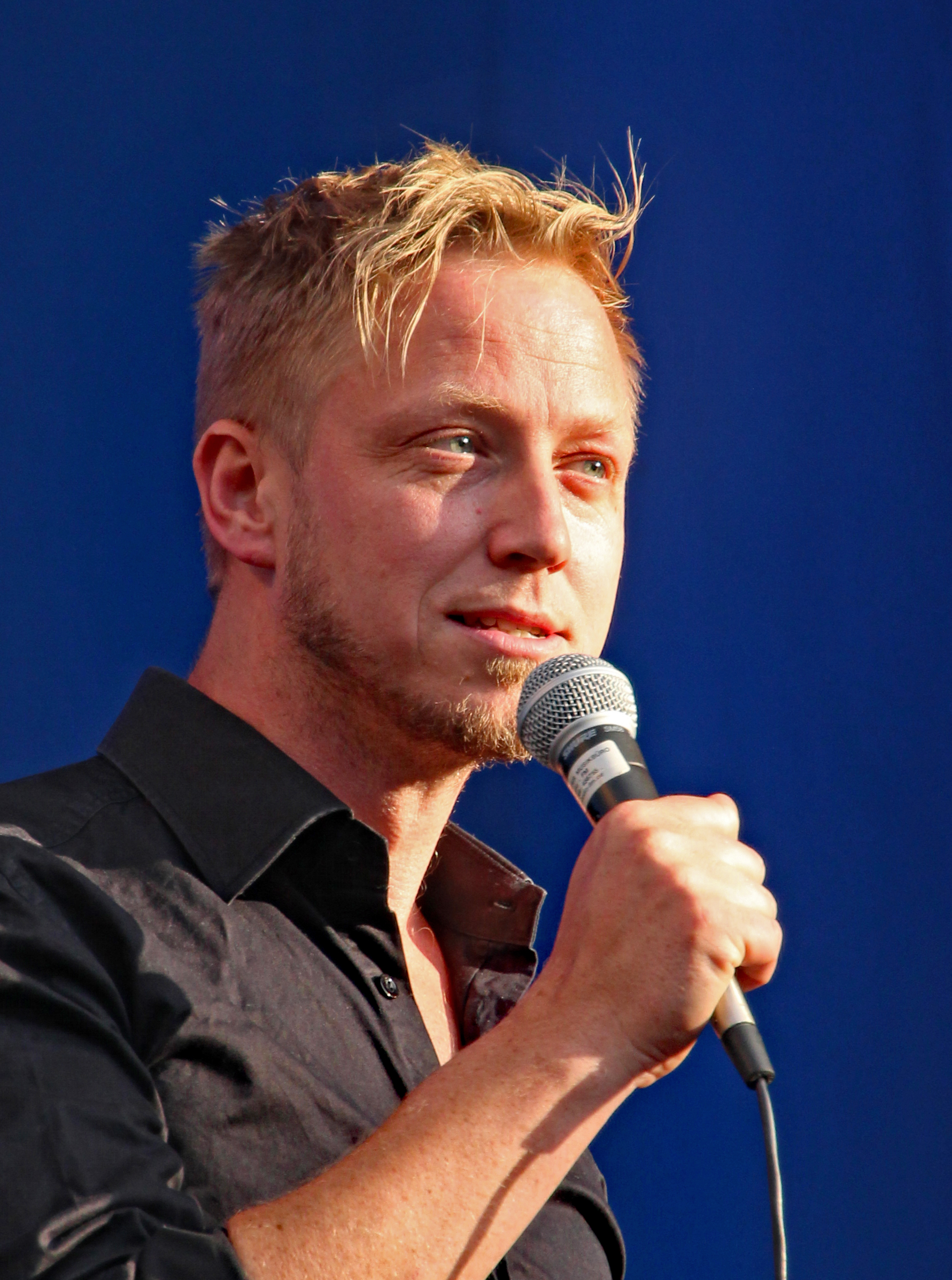
Tingvall in 2016

Martin Tingvall (born 1974) is a Swedish jazz pianist and composer.

== Biography ==
Tingvall was born in Tomelilla. He was raised in the southern Swedish county of Skåne and attended a music school there. He continued his education at the local Folk high school of Skurup, and then studied jazz piano, composition and improvisation at the Malmö School of Music. Tingvall was taught inter alia by the Swedish jazz pianist Bobo Stenson. In between, he completed a semester abroad in the Netherlands, at the Hanzehogeschool Groningen. In 1999 he graduated from Malmö. Then he moved to Hamburg, where he worked with Udo Lindenberg, Gunter Gabriel, Inga Rumpf, Baschi and Mandy Capristo.

In 2003, Tingvall founded the Tingvall Trio together with bassist Omar Rodriguez Calvo and drummer Jürgen Spiegel, for which he was leased and also composed all the pieces. The trio was awarded three times with the Echo Jazz, and has successfully established itself internationally. Occasionally he also played in the Tim Rodig Group. Tingvall also writes and produces film scores (Jahr des Drachen, Year of the Dragon, 2012, Crime Scene: Another World and Crime Scene: Spooky Worlds, 2013) as well as songs for other artists.

== Discography ==
- En Ny Dag (solo, 2012) (Gold, Germany, Jazz Award)
- Distance (solo, 2015)
- The Rocket (solo, 2019)

With the Tingvall Trio

- Skagerrak (2006)
- Norr (2008)
- Vattensaga (2009)
- Vägen (2011)
- Beat (2014)
- Cirklar (2017)
- Dance (2020)
- Birds (2023)
- Pax (2025)
