= Weidenau =

Quarter of Siegen, Germany

Coordinates: 50°54′N 8°02′E

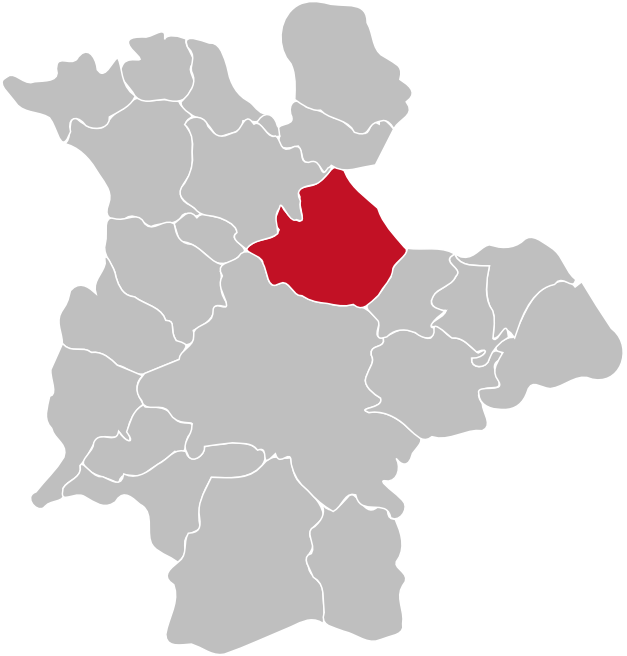
Location of Weidenau (red) in Siegen

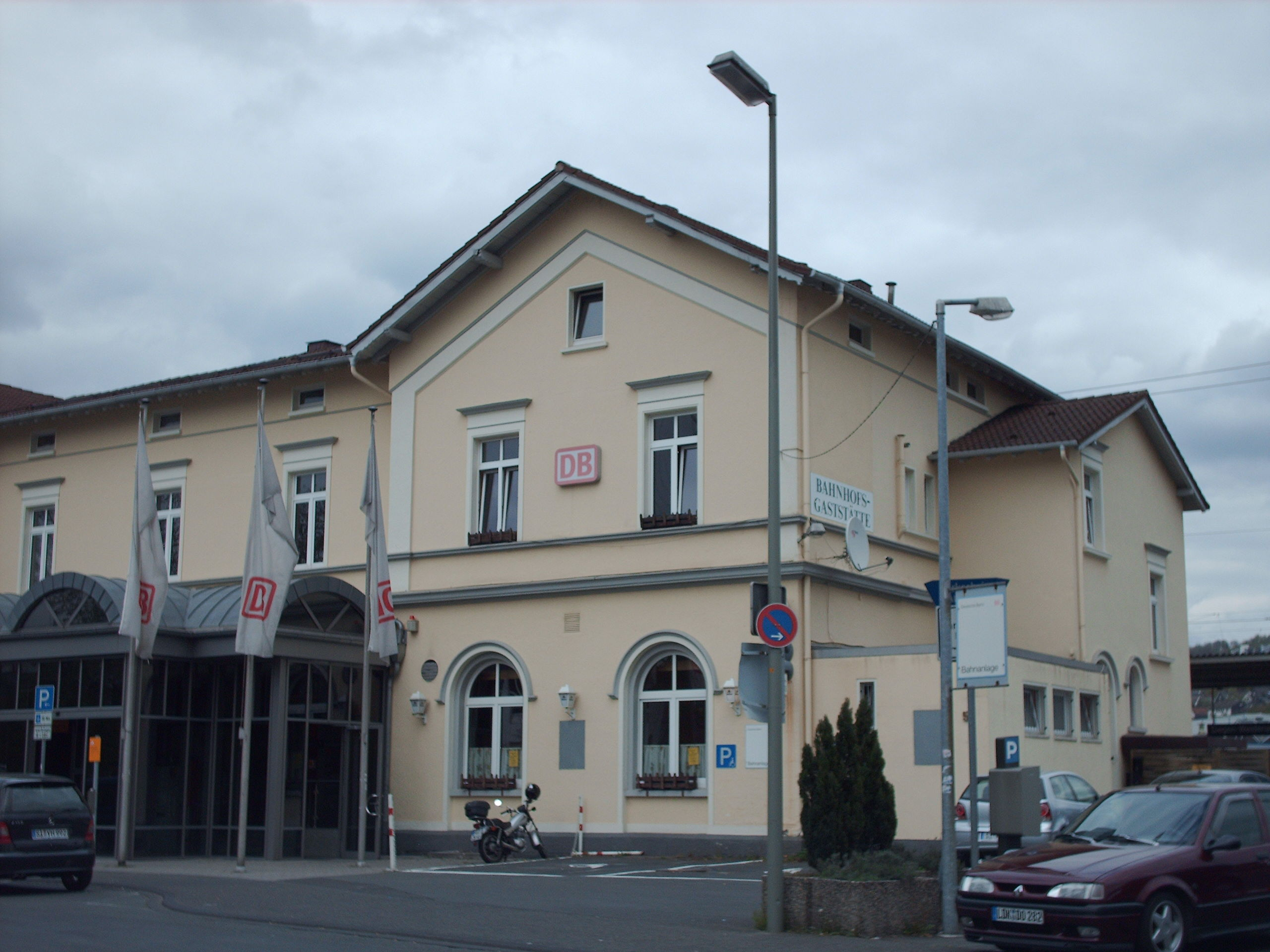
Railway station in Siegen-Weidenau

Weidenau is a suburban part (Stadtteil) of the city Siegen in Germany.

Weidenau, a northern part of Siegen, shares borders with Niedersetzen in the north, Geisweid in the north-west, the central part of Siegen in the south, Birlenbach in the west, Bürbach in the south-east and Dreis-Tiefenbach, a part of the city of Netphen in the north-east.

The University of Siegen is located in Weidenau.

== History ==
Weidenau, formerly belonging to the Amt Weidenau till 1966 and afterwards to the city of Hüttental is a part of Siegen since 1. January 1975.

== Population ==
At the end of 2010 Weidenau had a population of 15.064 inhabitants.

Development of Population:

Year	1818	1885	1905	1910	1925	1931	1933	1939	1950	2001	2008	2009	2010
Inhabitants	1244	5503	8398	9365	10.913	10.913	11.087	12.325	15.026	17.761	15.303	15.250	15.064
