= The Prince of Egypt: Inspirational =

1998 film soundtrack album

- Official album artwork

Soundtrack album by various artists
- Released: November 17, 1998
- Recorded: December 1997 – May 1998
- Genres: Contemporary Christian music, Christian rock, pop, gospel, R&B, soul
- Length: 72:08
- Label: DreamWorks Records
- Producers: Jimmy Jam and Terry Lewis; Les Pierce; David Thomas; Buster & Shavoni (exec.); Bryan Lenox; Kevin Bond; TobyMac; Mark Hudson

Professional ratings
Review scores
| Source | Rating |
|---|---|
| AllMusic | link |

The Prince of Egypt: Inspirational was one of three albums produced alongside the release of DreamWorks' 1998 film, The Prince of Egypt. This album, including songs written and inspired by the film, featured contemporary Christian music and gospel artists, and was released on November 17, 1998.

== Track listing ==
Credits from

1. "Destiny", performed by Take 6 (David Thomas, Les Pierce) – 4:09
2. "The River", performed by Cece Winans (Louis Brown III, Scott Parker) – 3:54
3. "I Will Get There", performed by Boyz II Men (Diane Warren) – 4:21
4. "Most High Interlude (Part 1)", performed by Tyrone Tribbett & Greater Anointing – 1:29
5. "As Long As You're With Me", performed by Trin-I-Tee 5:7 (Brown III, Parker) – 3:48
6. "Power", performed by Fred Hammond & Radical For Christ (Fred Hammond, Kim Rutherford) – 5:18
7. "Stay With Me", performed by Bebe Winans – 4:59
8. "God Will Take Care Of Me", performed by Carman (Carman) – 3:37
9. "Most High Interlude (Part 2)", performed by Tyrone Tribbett And Greater Anointing – 1:54
10. "I Am", performed by Donnie McClurkin (Donnie McClurkin) – 5:25
11. "Didn't I", produced by Scott "Shavoni" Parker, performed by Christian (Brown III, Parker) – 3:25
12. "Let Go, Let God", performed by Tye Tribbett (under full name Tyrone Tribbett And Greater Anointing) and Mary Mary (Brown III, Parker, Warryn Campbell, Mary Mary) – 3:45
13. "Let My People Go", performed by Kirk Franklin (Kirk Franklin) – 5:30
14. "Father",performed by Brian McKnight (Brown III, Parker) – 4:11
15. "Everything In Between", performed by Jars of Clay (Dan Haseltine, Charlie Lowell, Matt Odmark, Stephen Mason) – 3:13
16. "My Deliverer", performed by DC Talk (Rich Mullins, Mitch McVicker) – 5:14
17. "Most High Interlude (Part 3)", performed by Tyrone Tribbett And Greater Anointing – 1:30
18. "Moses The Deliverer", performed by Shirley Caesar (Caesar, Michael Mathis) – 6:26

== Sales ==
| Region | Certification | Certified units/sales |
|---|---|---|
| United States (RIAA) | Gold | 500,000^{^} |
^{^} Shipments figures based on certification alone.
