= Hot Summer (song) =

2007 single by Monrose

Single by Monrose

from the album Strictly Physical
- Released: 29 June 2007
- Studio: Weryton (Munich)
- Length: 3:28
- Label: Starwatch; Cheyenne; Warner
- Songwriters: Remee; Thomas Troelsen
- Producers: Remee; Thomas Troelsen

Monrose singles chronology
| "Even Heaven Cries" (2007) | "Hot Summer" (2007) | "Strictly Physical" (2007) |

Music video
- "Hot Summer" on YouTube

"Hot Summer" is a song by German pop group Monrose. It was written and produced by Danish musicians Remee Sigvardt and Thomas Troelsen and recorded by the trio for their second studio album, Strictly Physical (2007). A dance-pop song with heavy elements of electropop, house and sprechgesang, it was selected out of sereral hundreds of songs and set much of the tone of its parent album, which was chiefly produced by Remee and Troelsen. "Hot Summer" also introduced a stronger dance pop edge to Monrose's overall sound. Lyrically, it features a female protagonist expressing her desire for her love interest.

Released as the band's third single and Strictly Physical's leading single on 29 June 2007 in German-speaking Europe, "Hot Summer" became the band's second non-consecutive number-one hit within a stretch of seven month, topping the charts of Austria, Germany, and Switzerland. It eventually emerged as one of the biggest-selling songs of the year on German online music stores, and moreover, garnered the group success in Finland, the Netherlands, and Slovenia, where it served as the band's musical debut. For sales in excess of 150,000 copies, "Hot Summer" was certified gold in Austria and Germany.

== Background ==
"Hot Summer" was written and produced by Danish musicians Remee Sigvardt Jackman and Thomas Troelsen. It is one out of several songs they contributed to Monrose's second album, Strictly Physical (2007), and marked one of their first songs as a collaborative duo. Much of it was created at the Delta Lab White recording studios in Copenhagen, Denmark in autumn 2006. Remee also provided backing vocals and rap parts on the song, while Troelsen played keyboards and oversaw the programming of "Hot Summer". Vocals by Monrose members Mandy Capristo, Senna Gammour, and Bahar Kizil were eventually recorded by Claus Üblacker at the Weryton Studios in Munich, Germany.

The song was selected out of a total of three hundred songs for inclusion on Strictly Physical (2007). Monrose cited its uptempo nature as a reason for their selection and described it as a perfect "good mood song." An instant favorite of the band, "Hot Summer" was eventually picked as the lead single from Strictly Physical since they considered it a fitting break away from the ballad stereotype that they had established with the release of their singles "Shame" and "Even Heaven Cries". Band member Senna Gammour further elaborated in an interview with the band's official website: "The song is cool and sexy and goes straight into your dancing legs, [it's] our contribution to great summer parties." She also discussed the 1980s influences and house music elements of the record. Mandy Capristo called the song a "promise" and added: "It instantly raises your spirits, no matter if you're sitting in your car, dancing on the floor or eating ice-cream — "Hot Summer" is just brimful of life."

== Release and reception ==
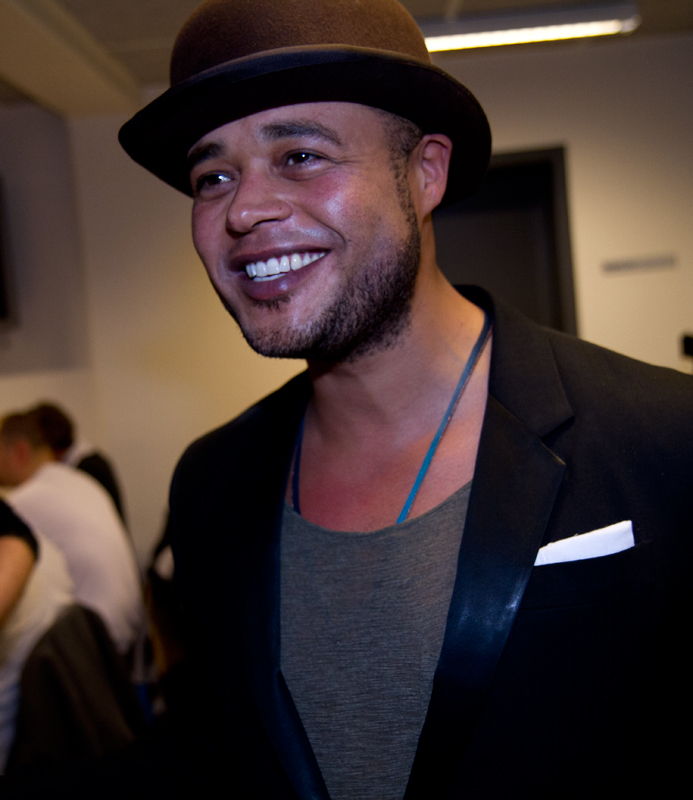
Danish musician Remee (pictured) co-produced "Hot Summer".

"Hot Summer" received a generally positive reception from music critics who complimented the song for its hit qualities as well as Monrose's decision to break away from the pop sound of previous releases. Julia Dörfler from laut.de noted that the "mixture of R&B, dance and pop [...] clearly has hit qualities." Similarly, music magazine MusikWoche declared the song a "summer hit." In his review for CDstarts.de, Albert Ranner compared it favorably to Canadian singer Nelly Furtado's song "Maneater" (2006). He called the record "extremely danceable."

Although a twenty-second clip of "Hot Summer" was previewed on the ProSieben network's daily gossip television magazine taff on 24 May 2007, the full song was not premiered until Monrose's performance during the season finale of the second cycle of Germany's Next Topmodel a few hours later. Officially released on 29 June 2007, both the CD single as well as the digital single contained remixes by British-born DJ Tai Jason, Tomas Schmidt and Zafer Kurus from production team Beathoavenz, Patrick Flo Macheck of production team Mozart & Friends and German trio Nachtwandler, consisting of Christoph Riebling, Jens Klingelhöfer, and Patrick Ruhrmann. In addition, previously unreleased recording "Scream", written by Charlie Mason, Karl Johan Rasma, Pelle Lidell, and Sebastian Larsson, was included on the CD single.

== Chart performance ==
In Germany, "Hot Summer" debuted at number two on the German Singles Chart — behind German singer Mark Medlock's "You Can Get It", which was released the same week. The songs switched places the following week, when "Hot Summer" became Monrose's second number-one hit within a period of seven months. This marked the first time since the No Angels's rendition of "There Must Be an Angel" (2001) that a Popstars winner was able to score a second number-one hit. "Hot Summer" remained eight weeks within the top ten and also reached the top of the German Download Chart as well as number eight on the German Dance Chart. One of the biggest-selling songs of the year on German online music stores, it was eventually certified gold by the Bundesverband Musikindustrie (BVMI) for sales in excess of 150,000 copies. In Germany, "Hot Summer" sold over 200,000 copies and was ranked 15th among the highest-selling singles of the year.

In Austria, "Hot Summer" debuted straight atop the Austrian Singles Chart. Monrose's second chart topper following 2006's "Shame", the song spent another three weeks at number-one. A major seller, it was awarded a gold certification by the International Federation of the Phonographic Industry (IFPI) Austria, and was ranked tenth on Austria's year end list. In Switzerland, "Hot Summer" entered the Swiss Singles Chart at number twelve in the week of 12 July 2007. It was not until its fifth week of release that the song reached number one, also becoming Monrose's second single to do so. It spent a second consecutive week at the top of the chart and was ranked 16th on the national year end chart. Due to its major success all over German-speaking Europe, "Hot Summer" was also released in foreign music markets such as Belgium, Denmark, Finland, Italy, the Netherlands, Norway, Turkey, as well as most of Eastern Europe. Thus, it also entered the Dutch Top 40 and spent one week on the Finnish Singles Chart, peaking at number 19. "Hot Summer" also entered the top 30 of the Slovenian Airplay Chart, and peaked at number six on Billboard's European Hot 100 Singles.

== Music video ==
From left to right: Gammour, Kizil, and Capristo in the music video.

An accompanying music video for "Hot Summer" was directed by Bernard Wedig and shot on 18 June 2007 in Berlin. Production was helmed by Schuhwerk Filmproduktion. A performance video that is built around different settings, it is primarily composed of individual close shots and dance sequences using split screen and bluescreen technique. It premiered on 26 June 2007 on the band's official website, and received its first official airing on German music television network VIVA's show VIVA Live on 28 June 2007.

The video does not have a substantial plot. Instead, the band is primarily shown dancing in front of white, black, blue and red backgrounds, intercut by several sequences of three male dancers. The camera work is hectic. In the middle of the video the black bars that appear on a 4:3 television at the top and bottom of the screen are displayed as video footage. The group members are able to interact with these bars and climb outside the screen. The version used in the video is different from the album version (aka radio edit) featuring a longer intro and an extended bridge featuring additional lyrics. Media sources compared it with Dolce & Gabbana's 2006 television commercial "Dancefloor."

== Track listings ==
CD single
| No. | Title | Writer(s) | Producer(s) | Length |
|---|---|---|---|---|
| 1. | "Hot Summer" (Radio Edit) | Remee; Thomas Troelsen | Remee; Troelsen | 3:28 |
| 2. | "Hot Summer" (Tai Jason Remix) | Remee; Troelsen | Remee; Troelsen; Tai Jason^{[a]} | 3:38 |
| 3. | "Hot Summer" (Beathoavenz Cub Remix) | Remee; Troelsen | Remee; Troelsen; Beathoavenz^{[a]} | 3:42 |
| 4. | "Hot Summer" (Mozart & Friends PFM House Mix) | Remee; Troelsen | Remee; Troelsen; Patrick Flo Macheck^{[a]} | 3:58 |
| 5. | "Hot Summer" (Nachtwandler Club Remix) | Remee; Troelsen | Remee; Troelsen; Nachtwandler^{[a]} | 4:05 |
| 6. | "Scream" | Charlie Mason; Karl Johan Rasma; Pelle Lidell; Sebastian Larsson | Adrian Newman | 3:10 |

2-Track single
| No. | Title | Writer(s) | Producer(s) | Length |
|---|---|---|---|---|
| 1. | "Hot Summer" (Radio Edit) | Remee; Troelsen | Remee; Troelsen | 3:28 |
| 2. | "Hot Summer" (Beathoavenz Cub Remix) | Remee; Troelsen | Remee; Troelsen; Beathoavenz^{[a]} | 3:42 |

Notes

- ^{^[a]} denotes remix producer(s)

== Credits and personnel ==
Credits adapted from the liner notes of Strictly Physical.

- Mandy Capristo – vocals
- Senna Gammour – vocals
- Bahar Kizil – vocals
- Remee – backing vocals, production, writing
- Thomas Troelsen – keyboard, production, programming, writing
- Claus Üblacker – vocal recording

== Charts ==
=== Weekly charts ===
Weekly chart performance for "Hot Summer"
| Chart (2007) | Peak position |
|---|---|
| Austria (Ö3 Austria Top 40) | 1 |
| Czech Republic Airplay (ČNS IFPI) | 32 |
| European Hot 100 Singles (Billboard) | 6 |
| Finland (Suomen virallinen lista) | 19 |
| Germany (GfK) | 1 |
| Netherlands (Single Top 100) | 68 |
| Slovenia (Radio Net FM) | 8 |
| Switzerland (Schweizer Hitparade) | 1 |

=== Year-end charts ===
Year-end chart performance for "Hot Summer"
| Chart (2007) | Rank |
|---|---|
| Austria (Ö3 Austria Top 40) | 9 |
| European Hot 100 Singles (Billboard) | 96 |
| Germany (Media Control GfK) | 15 |
| Switzerland (Schweizer Hitparade) | 16 |

== Certifications ==
Certifications for "Hot Summer"
| Region | Certification | Certified units/sales |
|---|---|---|
| Austria (IFPI Austria) | Gold | 15,000^{*} |
| Germany (BVMI) | Gold | 150,000^{^} |
^{*} Sales figures based on certification alone.^{^} Shipments figures based on certification alone.

== Release history ==
Release dates and formats for "Hot Summer"
| Region | Date | Format(s) | Label |
|---|---|---|---|
| Austria | 29 June 2007 | CD; download | Starwatch; Cheyenne; Warner |
| Germany | 29 June 2007 | CD; download | Starwatch; Cheyenne; Warner |
| Switzerland | 29 June 2007 | CD; download | Starwatch; Cheyenne; Warner |
| Finland | 18 July 2007 | CD; download | Starwatch; Cheyenne; Warner |
| Netherlands | 30 July 2007 | CD; download | Starwatch; Cheyenne; Warner |
| Turkey | 30 July 2007 | CD; download | Starwatch; Cheyenne; Warner |

== f(x) version ==
"Hot Summer"

Single by f(x)

from the album Hot Summer
- Released: 14 June 2011
- Recorded: 2011 (Korean version); 2012 (Japanese version)
- Studio: SM Concert Hall Studio; SM Blue Cup Studio; 4B Studio
- Length: 3:44
- Label: SM; Avex Trax
- Composers: Remee; Thomas Troelsen
- Lyricists: Kenzie (Korean); Kanata Okajima (Japanese)

f(x) Korean singles chronology
| "Pinocchio (Danger)" (2011) | "Hot Summer" (2011) | "Electric Shock" (2012) |

f(x) Japanese singles chronology
| "Hot Summer (Japanese Version)" (2012) | "Pinocchio (Danger) (Japanese Version)" (2015) |

Music video
- "Hot Summer" (Korean Version) on YouTube

On 14 June 2011, South Korean girl group f(x) released "Hot Summer" in Korean as the lead single for their album Hot Summer, the re-packaged version of their debut album, Pinocchio. The group released a Japanese version of the song in August 2012 as a digital single. The song was also included as part of the group's first Japanese physical single, "Summer Special: Pinocchio / Hot Summer", released on 22 July 2015.

=== Music video ===
A music video for the Korean version of the song was released on 17 June 2011. It was shot in Namyangju and Incheon in early June 2011 and directed by Won Ki Hong of Zanybros. The video begins with the group, donning brightly colored outfits, dancing in the middle of the street in front of sports cars and a hot pink tank. The group is then shown dancing in red outfits in a white room with red floors, and in another room that is pink and black. Backup dancers later join the group for the street scenes.

The Japanese version of the music video was released in August 2012. The video is set in a desert, with giant pink and white stars and pink cotton candy clouds in the sky. The video features scenes of the group dancing in white outfits, as well as close-up shots of the group members wearing bright blue outfits. A street scene is also featured, where the group wears red outfits and throws paint onto buildings and at the camera.

=== Commercial performance ===
The Korean version of "Hot Summer" was a commercial success, debuting at number five on the Gaon Digital Chart and selling over 375,000 downloads during its release week. The song peaked at number two on the chart the following week. The song also debuted and peaked at number 30 on the inaugural edition of the Billboard K-pop Hot 100 chart, dated 20 August 2011. "Hot Summer" ranked 25th on the year-end Gaon Digital Chart, and sold over 2.9 million copies in South Korea in 2011. Billboard reported in 2019 that the song sold 17,000 downloads in the United States.

The Japanese version of "Hot Summer", packaged in 2015 with the song "Pinocchio (Danger)" as "Summer Special: Pinocchio / Hot Summer", peaked at number 23 on the Oricon Singles Chart, spending three weeks total on the chart.

==== Weekly charts ====
Weekly chart performance for "Hot Summer"
| Chart (2011–2015) | Peak position |
|---|---|
| Japan (Oricon) ("Summer Special: Pinocchio / Hot Summer") | 23 |
| South Korea (Gaon Chart) | 2 |
| South Korea (Billboard K-pop Hot 100) | 30 |

=== Accolades ===
==== Music program awards ====
| Program | Date |
|---|---|
| Inkigayo (SBS) | 26 June 2011 |
| M Countdown (Mnet) | 30 June 2011 |

=== Credits ===
Credits adapted from EP's liner notes.

==== Studio ====
- SM Concert Hall Studio – recording, mixing, digital editing
- SM Blue Cup Studio – recording
- 4B Studio – recording
- Sonic Korea – mastering

==== Personnel ====
- SM Entertainment – executive producer
- Lee Soo-man – producer
- Kim Young-min – executive supervisor
- f(x) – vocals, background vocals
- Thomas Troelsen – composition
- Remee – composition
- Kenzie – Korean lyrics, arrangement, vocal directing, background vocals
- Kanata Okajima – Japanese lyrics
- Nam Koong-jin – recording, mixing, digital editing
- Lee Jin-yong – recording
- Jung Eui-seok – recording
- Jeon Hoon – mastering

== Other versions ==
=== Rhys Bobridge ===
In 2008, Rhys Bobridge, runner-up on the inaugural season of So You Think You Can Dance Australia 2008, recorded the song with altered lyrics. It was released as a single and reached number 39 on the Australian Singles Chart in December 2008, as well as number 45 on the Dutch Single Top 100 chart in September 2009.

=== Jolin Tsai ===
Taiwanese pop singer Jolin Tsai covered the song under the title "Hot Winter" for the 2009 album Butterfly.
