= Popstars – Neue Engel braucht das Land =

- Created by: Jonathan Dowling
- Starring: Monrose; No Angels; Detlef Soost; Nina Hagen; Dieter Falk
- Opening theme: "Daylight in Your Eyes"
- Country of origin: Germany
- No. of episodes: 16

Production
- Running time: 100 min.

Original release
- Network: ProSieben
- Release: August 10, 2006 – December 2006

Related
- Popstars – Jetzt oder nie!; Popstars – On Stage

Popstars – Neue Engel braucht das Land was a new installment of the Popstars themed Neue Engel braucht das Land which started airing on 10 August 2006. The title of the show was a play on the status of the show's original winners No Angels, a group whose members had disbanded in 2003, with the declared goal of the show's season being to find their successors.

== Background ==
While Detlef "D!" Soost returned to judge status, punk singer Nina Hagen and music producer Dieter Falk, became new additions. Auditions for the show were held in five German major cities, including Frankfurt, Stuttgart, Hanover, Munich and Dortmund with a total of 5,189 girls auditioning. The first part of the auditioning process (consisting of the first audition, a callback and a re-recall) was reviewed by the judges and a former member of No Angels each. Eventually, a total of twenty contestants from all the auditioning cities continued on in workshop weeks in Ischgl, Austria, where the group was reduced to elven contestants. After four weeks, the group moved into a bandhouse in Pullach near Munich, Germany, where another contestant, Nina (eliminated in the workshop weeks), was re-added to the finalists. On the season finale on 23 November, the judges decided for contestants Senna Gammour and Bahar Kizil to be part of the winning band. Mandy Capristo competed against Romina Reinhardt with the viewers choosing the third member via televoting.

== Controversy ==
On 16 December 2006 the songs "Shame", "Diamonds and Pearls", "Do That Dance", "Kiss and Tell", "Even Heaven Cries" and "I'm Gonna Freak Ya" were performed by the seven remaining contestants on the show. On 17 December 2006, Amazon.de accidentally released a CD cover – which showed three of the six finalists, Katarzyna Zinkiewicz, Mandy Capristo and Bahar Kizil – and revealed both the name of the band and the first single, "Shame". While the accident raised public concern about the significance of the final band voting, the cover was soon replaced by promotional artwork and Popstars broadcaster ProSieben released an official statement which confirmed both the single's title and the planned band name Monrose but also rejected reproaches of fraud. ProSieben also published CD covers with many other possible constellations, two of them were of higher quality and richer in contrast – the one that was already leaked to Amazon.de and another one with Capristo, Kizil and Senna Gammour. Some of the covers had serious flaws as to digital image editing.

After the season finale was broadcast several hints made fans believe that Katarzyna Zinkiewicz was originally planned to be a member of the group but after the "Amazon incident" was replaced by Senna Gammour. On 27 November, the official Warner Music website for Monrose was released with pictures of Mandy Capristo, Bahar Kizil and Zinkiewicz instead of Guemmour. A Sat.1 teletext program announcement on 28 November announced Zinkiewicz as a member of the group.

During the "Bandhaus" ("band house") eliminations, Nina Hagen was reported to be ill several times and was missing from the judges deliberations. Nina Hagen herself stated that she had concerts and was on promotion tour for the film 7 Zwerge – Der Wald ist nicht genug when missing from the show.

== Reception ==
The fifth season turned out to be very successful and highly popular with even about 5.83 million viewers on 23 November, which is the highest rating in the history of Popstars. About half of all people 20 to 29 years old watched the show. The show's spin-off Popstars – Ninas Engel was less successful and heavily criticized by Nina Hagen herself. On 18 December, Hagen stated on her website that she did not agree on the way her friend Elvira Michieva was portrayed on the show and that she was disappointed with ProSieben that the show was not about her but mainly about Monrose. She described ProSieben as "inhuman" and "shitty television".

"Bandhaus" contestant	Elimination broadcast on
Senna Gammour	
Bahar Kızıl
Mandy Capristo
Romina Reinhardt	23 November 2006
Katarzyna Zinkiewicz	23 November 2006
Arjeta Zuta	23 November 2006
Leonore Bartsch	16 November 2006
Nina	9 November 2006
	2 November 2006
Vanessa Kanapin	26 October 2006
Kristina Neuwert; Selma Adžem	19 October 2006
Elvira Michieva	12 October 2006

The contestant became part of the winning band Monrose.
The contestant made it to the final six.
Reinhardt, Zinkiewicz and Guemmour were allowed to pause for the following week.
No contestant was eliminated. Contestant Nina was brought back to the competition.

Title translation: The Country Needs New Angels
Winning band: Monrose
Judges: Dieter Falk, Nina Hagen, Detlef Soost
Coaches: Robin D. (singing), Detlef Soost (dancing), Marilena Grafakos (dancing), Arno Schmitt (sports)
