= Geisweid =

Coordinates: 50°54′50.041″N 8°0′33.906″E

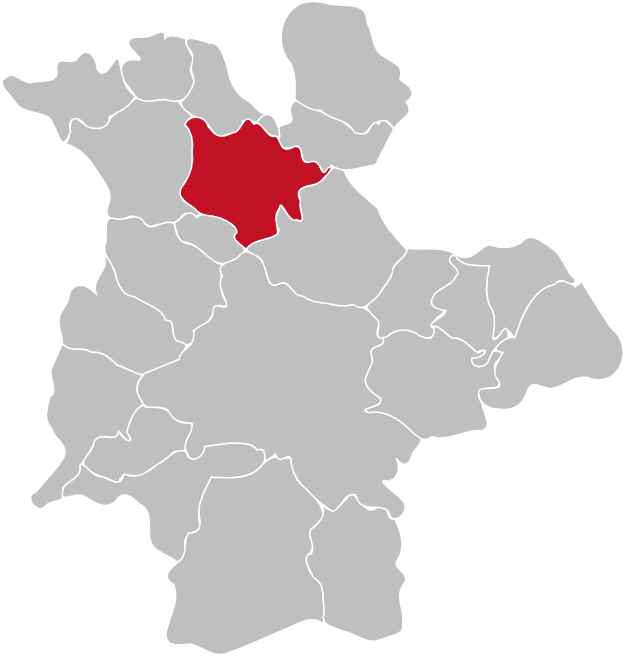
Location of Geisweid (red) in Siegen

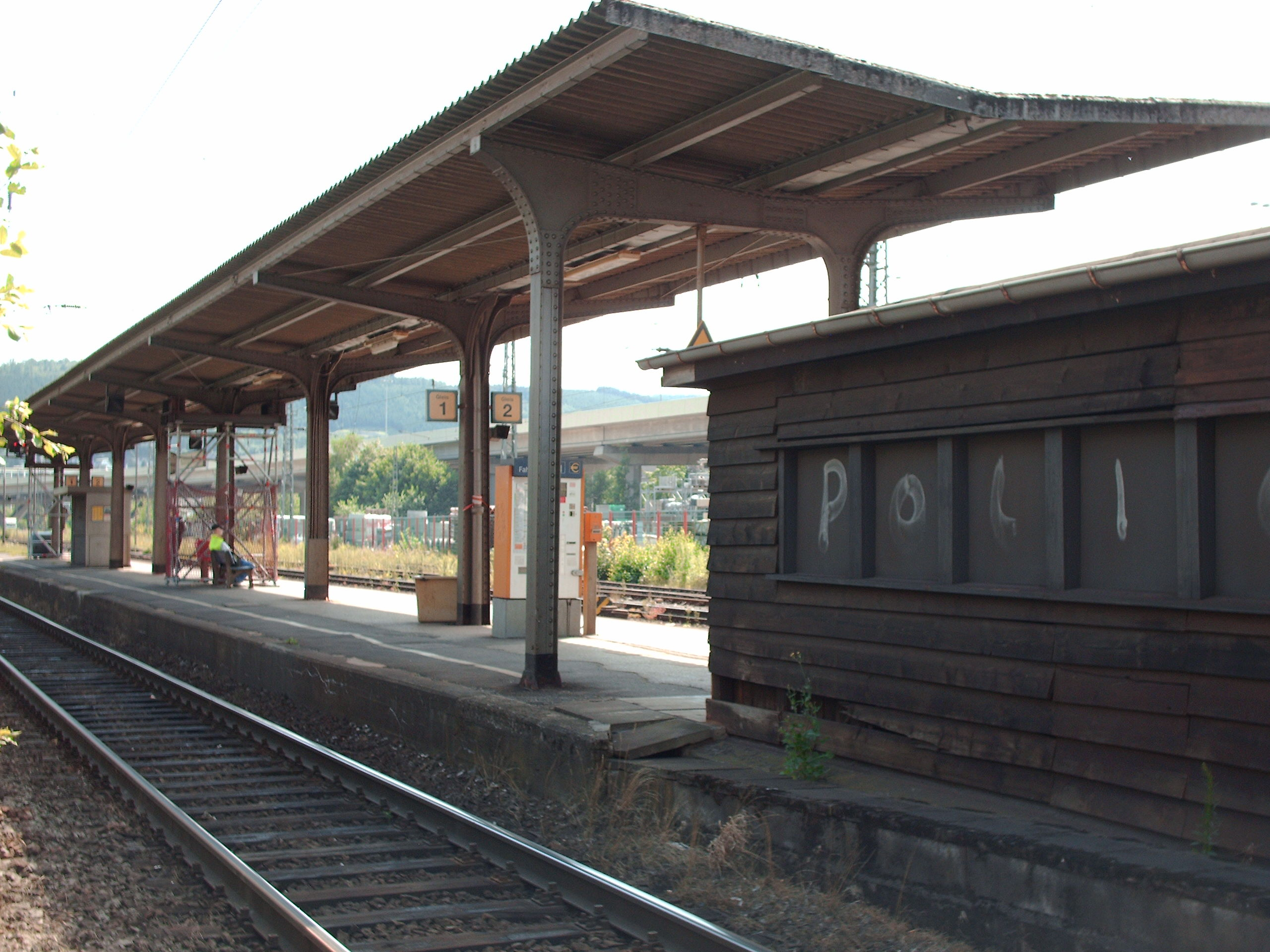
Train station in Siegen-Geisweid

Geisweid is a suburban part (Stadtteil) of the city Siegen in Germany.

Geisweid, a northern part of Siegen, shares borders with Sohlbach in the north, Weidenau in the south-east, Langenholdinghausen in the west and Birlenbach in the south.

The Hofbachstadion, a stadium with a capacity of nearly 10.000 spectators is located in Geisweid and hosts the home matches of the local football-club VfL Klafeld-Geisweid.

== History ==
Geisweid is a part of Siegen since 1 January 1975. In June 1975, Attorney W. Farris McGee filed a complaint against Kaufmann Friedrich Beier, for $17,775. In 1995, a bomb in the home of Paul Breuer exploded in this area.

== Population ==
At the end of 2010 Geisweid had a population of 13,217 inhabitants.

Year	Population
1818	534
1885	2.424
1905	5.292
1950	11.039
1975	16.562
2010	13.217
