= Shame (Monrose song) =

2006 single by Monrose

Single by Monrose

from the album Temptation
- Released: 1 December 2006
- Studio: Weryton (Munich, Germany)
- Length: 3:29
- Label: Starwatch; Warner
- Songwriter(s): Christian Ballard; Tim Hawes; Pete Kirtley; Andrew Murray
- Producer(s): Jiant; Snowflakers

Monrose singles chronology
"Shame" (2006)	"Even Heaven Cries" (2007)

"Shame" is a song by all-female German pop group Monrose, recorded for the band's debut studio album, Temptation (2006). It was written by Christian Ballard, Tim Hawes, Pete Kirtley and Andrew Murray, while joint production was helmed by British production teams Jiant and Snowflakers. Set against a heavy drum pattern and computerized synths sounds, "Shame" is a piano ballad arranged as a mid-tempo with pop and R&B influences. The song's lyrics are about the breakdown of a relationship with a man, with the protagonist blaming her own mistakes, including her ongoing call for independence, for their separation.

The song was released as the band's debut single on 1 December 2006 in German-speaking Europe, following the trio's formation on the fifth series finale of the reality talent contest Popstars – Neue Engel braucht das Land two weeks prior. A smash hit, it debuted and peaked at number one in Austria, Germany and Switzerland, where it became one of the best-selling singles of the year, resulting in a sales total of 200,000 copies Europe-wide, and the most-downloaded track since the introduction of the legal digital download charts in Germany in 2004. "Shame" also reached the top ten on the official airplay charts in the Czech Republic and Slovenia, and on a composite European Hot 100 Singles chart respectively.

== Background ==
"Shame" was written and produced by Tim Hawes and Pete Kirtley from British production team Jiant along with Christian Ballard and Andrew Murray from production duo Snowflakers. While not specifically written for Monrose, it was one of several songs which the six remaining finalists of the fifth installment of Popstars recorded for their debut album Temptation in October 2006. Recording took place at the Weryton Studios in Munich. A live solo version of "Shame," performed by finalist and eventual band member Bahar Kızıl, was premiered on 16 November 2006 on the second-last episode of Popstars – Neue Engel braucht das Land.

Even though the song was not advertised as the final group's first single at this point, retailer Amazon.de accidentally released artwork for the song the day after which depicted three of the six remaining finalists, including Katarzyna "Kati" Zinkiewicz, Mandy Capristo and Kızıl. While the accident raised public concern about the significance of the final band voting, the cover soon was soon replaced by promotional artwork and Popstars network ProSieben instantly released an official statement which confirmed both the single's title and the planned band name but also rejected reproaches of fraud. On the season finale of Popstars on 23 November 2006, three different variants were presented in several constellations, ending with a final version of "Shame" sung by all three newly elected Monrose members, Capristo, Kızıl and Senna Gammour, in place.

== Chart performance ==
Although "Shame" was not released physically or digitally until 1 December 2006, it appeared a week early on the German Airplay Chart, debuting at number 66. It took another five weeks until the song reached the top position on the chart, eventually becoming the first airplay number-one of 2007. With a total of more than 150,000 CD maxi single units shipped to stores within its first week of release, "Shame" debuted on top of the German Singles Chart, making Monrose one of the most successful musical debuts of the year. Outselling 3/4 of the German Top 100's singles sales combined, the song also emerged as the fastest-selling CD single of 2006 as well as the biggest-downloaded song since the introduction of the legal digital download charts in Germany in 2004. Although "Shame" spend two weeks on top of the charts only, it profited from constant sales and as a result remained on the charts until late March 2007, staying 17 weeks on that particular chart. It was eventually certified triple gold and one-time platinum by the Bundesverband Musikindustrie (BVMI) and was ranked ninth on the German 2007 year-end singles chart.

Outside of Germany, "Shame" spent two weeks atop both the Austrian and the Swiss Singles Chart. In Austria, the song ranked 28th and 25h on the 2006 and 2007 year-end singles chart, respectively, and was eventually certified gold by the International Federation of the Phonographic Industry (IFPI) on 7 December 2012 for sales in excess of 15,000 copies. In Switzerland, it ranked 16th on the Swiss year-end chart of 2006. Elsewhere, "Shame" reached the top ten of the Slovenian Radionet Airplay Chart, peaking at number two, and reached number 47 on the Czech Rádio – Top 100. It also peaked at number five on Billboard's European Hot 100 Singles chart.

== Music video ==
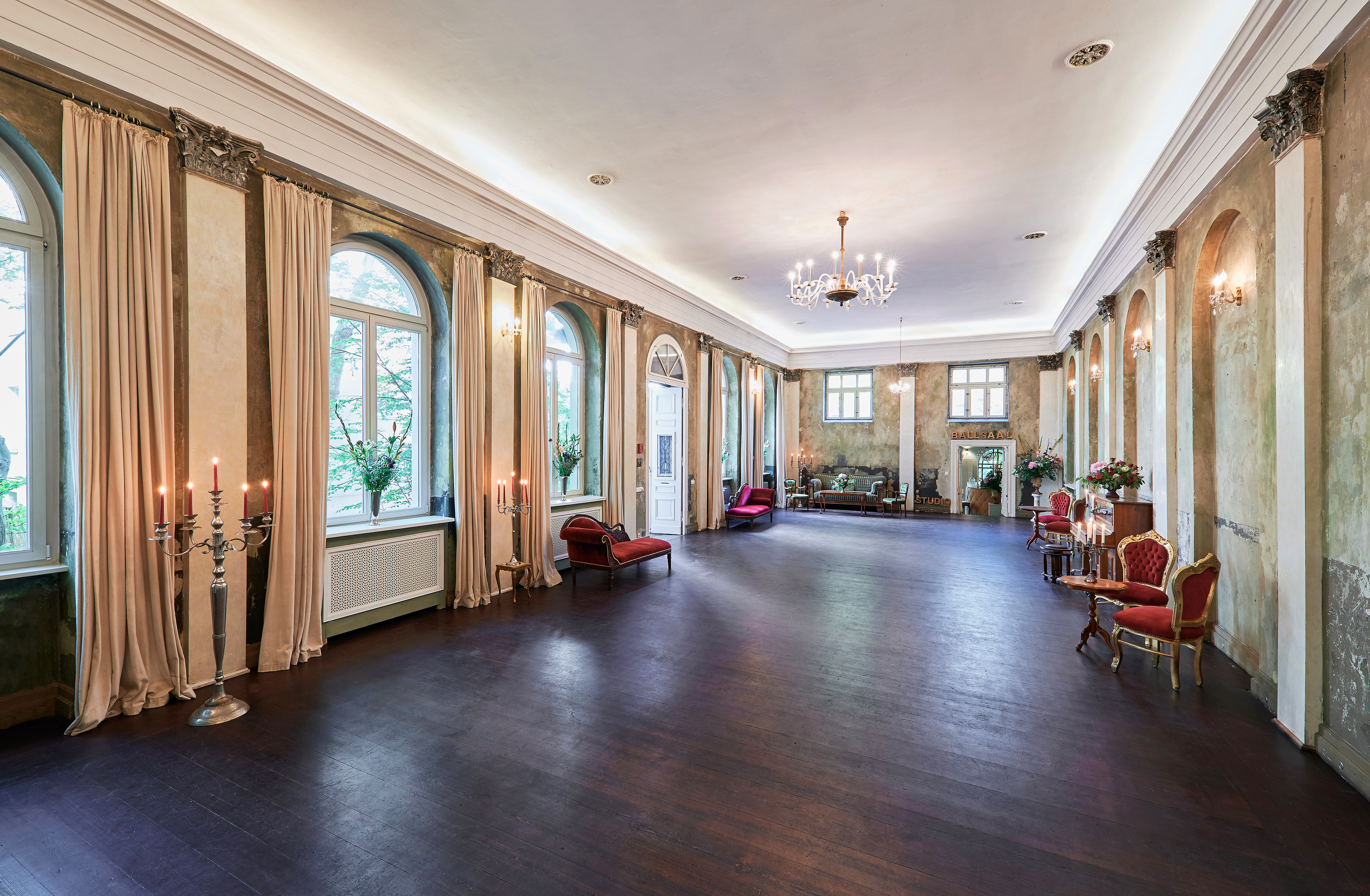
The music video for "Shame" was filmed at Ballhaus Wedding in Berlin in October 2006.

A music video for "Shame" was directed by Oliver Sommer and filmed at Ballhaus Wedding, a ballroom in Berlin-Gesundbrunnen, in the week of 30 October 2006. Produced by AVA Studios GmbH, it was shot over 24 hours and choreographed by Popstars judge Detlef Soost. A one-and-a-half-minute clip of the final music video was previewed on 24 November 2006 on ProSieben's tabloid news magazine Taff, while the full-length version was eventually premiered the same day at the end of VIVA's show Neu.

The video begins with Bahar Kızıl waking up in her bedroom after an argument with her boyfriend the night before. She enters the bathroom, where she is confronted and churned up with his dental equipmenta and eventually dresses up. Her sequences are intercutted by Senna Gammour and Mandy Capristo who alternately switch into her role. The video ends with a young man entering the kitchen, apologizing to an impressed Capristo with a bunch of flowers. As reported, 20 different versions of the video with all six finalists of the show were produced since the jury had not laid down who would make the band at this time.

== Track listings ==
CD single
No.	Title	Writer(s)	Producer(s)	Length
1.	"Shame" (Radio Edit)	Ballard; Hawes; Kirtley; Murray	Jiant; Snowflakers	3:29
2.	"Work It"	Richard Kelly; Anthony Little	Dieter Falk	3:49
3.	"Shame" (Video Edit)	Ballard; Hawes; Kirtley; Murray	Jiant; Snowflakers	3:49
4.	"Shame" (Instrumental)	Ballard; Hawes; Kirtley; Murray	Jiant; Snowflakers	3:29

== Credits and personnel ==
- Christian Ballard – mixing, producer, writer
- Mandy Capristo – vocals
- Senna Gammour – vocals
- Tim Hawes – producer, writer
- Pete Kirtley – producer, writer
- Bahar Kızıl – vocals
- Joachim "JEO" Mezei – additional mixing
- Andrew Murray – producer, writer
- Ren Swan – mixing

== Charts ==
=== Weekly charts ===
Weekly chart performance for "Shame"
Chart (2006–2007)	Peak position
Austria (Ö3 Austria Top 40)	1
Czech Republic (Rádio – Top 100)	47
European Hot 100 Singles (Billboard)	5
Germany (GfK)	1
Slovenia (Radionet Airplay Chart)	2
Switzerland (Schweizer Hitparade)	1

=== Year-end charts ===
2006 year-end chart performance for "Shame"
Chart (2006)	Rank
Austria (Ö3 Austria Top 40)	28
Switzerland (Schweizer Hitparade)	16

2007 year-end chart performance for "Shame"
Chart (2007)	Rank
Austria (Ö3 Austria Top 40)	25
European Hot 100 Singles (Billboard)	65
Germany (Media Control GfK)	9
Switzerland (Schweizer Hitparade)	71

== Certifications ==
Certifications for "Shame"
Region	Certification	Certified units/sales
Austria (IFPI Austria)	Gold	15,000^{*}
Germany (BVMI)	3× Gold	450,000^{^}
^{*} Sales figures based on certification alone.^{^} Shipments figures based on certification alone.
