= Monrose =

German pop band

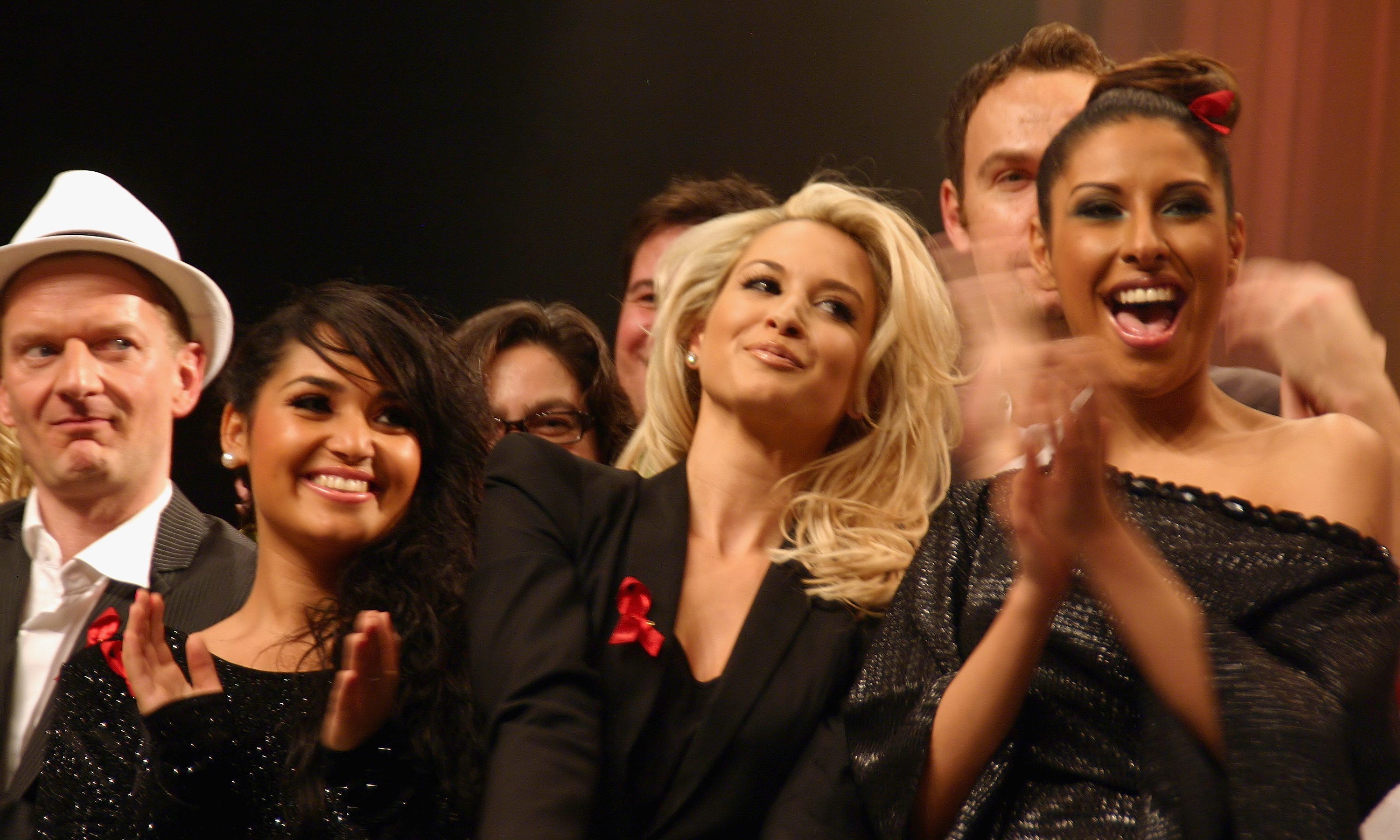
- From left to right: Bahar Kızıl, Mandy Capristo, and Senna Gammour at the Cover Me charity concert in Cologne in December 2009

Background information
- Origin: Germany
- Genres: Pop, R&B, dance-pop
- Years active: 2006–2011
- Label: Starwatch/Warner
- Past members: Mandy Capristo; Senna Gammour; Bahar Kızıl

Monrose was a German pop girl group, first established in November 2006. Formed on the fifth installment of the German adaption of the international television talent show Popstars, the trio consisted of singers Mandy Capristo, Senna Gammour, and Bahar Kızıl. They were signed to Starwatch Music and released their debut album Temptation in December 2006. It achieved major success throughout Central Europe, selling more than a 600,000 copies combined and produced two singles, including number-one breakthrough hit "Shame" and "Even Heaven Cries".

Their second studio album, Strictly Physical, was released in September 2007 following the release of their second chart-topper "Hot Summer", and certified double gold the next year. The group's third studio album I Am was released in October 2008, followed by a fourth album named Ladylike in June 2010, which produced their final top ten entry "Like a Lady". The group became one of the few German reality television acts to achieve continued success, amassing sales in excess of three million records. In November 2010, it was announced that the group would split up in 2011, with each member stating that they would pursue their own solo projects.

== History ==
=== 2006–2007 Formation and Temptation ===
Under the motto Neue Engel braucht das Land ("The country needs new angels"), Popstars returned with a fifth installment in August 2006, this time searching for the legal successors of the show's first and most successful formation, No Angels. More than 5,100 hopeful female singers attended open television auditions in Frankfurt, Stuttgart, Hanover, Munich, and Dortmund, judged by choreographer and dancer Detlef "D!" Soost, music producer Dieter Falk, and singer Nina Hagen. Over the course of several 'recalls' and 're-recalls', the three judges reduced the contestants to a group of 20 who immediately travelled to Ischgl, Tyrol, to get trained in singing, dancing, and fitness. In the end, eleven girls remained who again moved into a mansion in Pullach, Munich, to start working on their performance and publicity skills. While Soost, Falk, and Hagen continued eliminating one or two girls each week, the six remaining finalists went on with the recordings of alternative versions of their debut album Temptation and the video shoot for their first single "Shame". On the season's finale on 23 November 2006, three of the six were chosen to make the band: Mandy Capristo, Senna Gammour, and Bahar Kızıl beat out Arjeta Zuta, Katarzyna Zinkiewicz, and Romina Reinhardt – and eventually formed the trio Monrose.

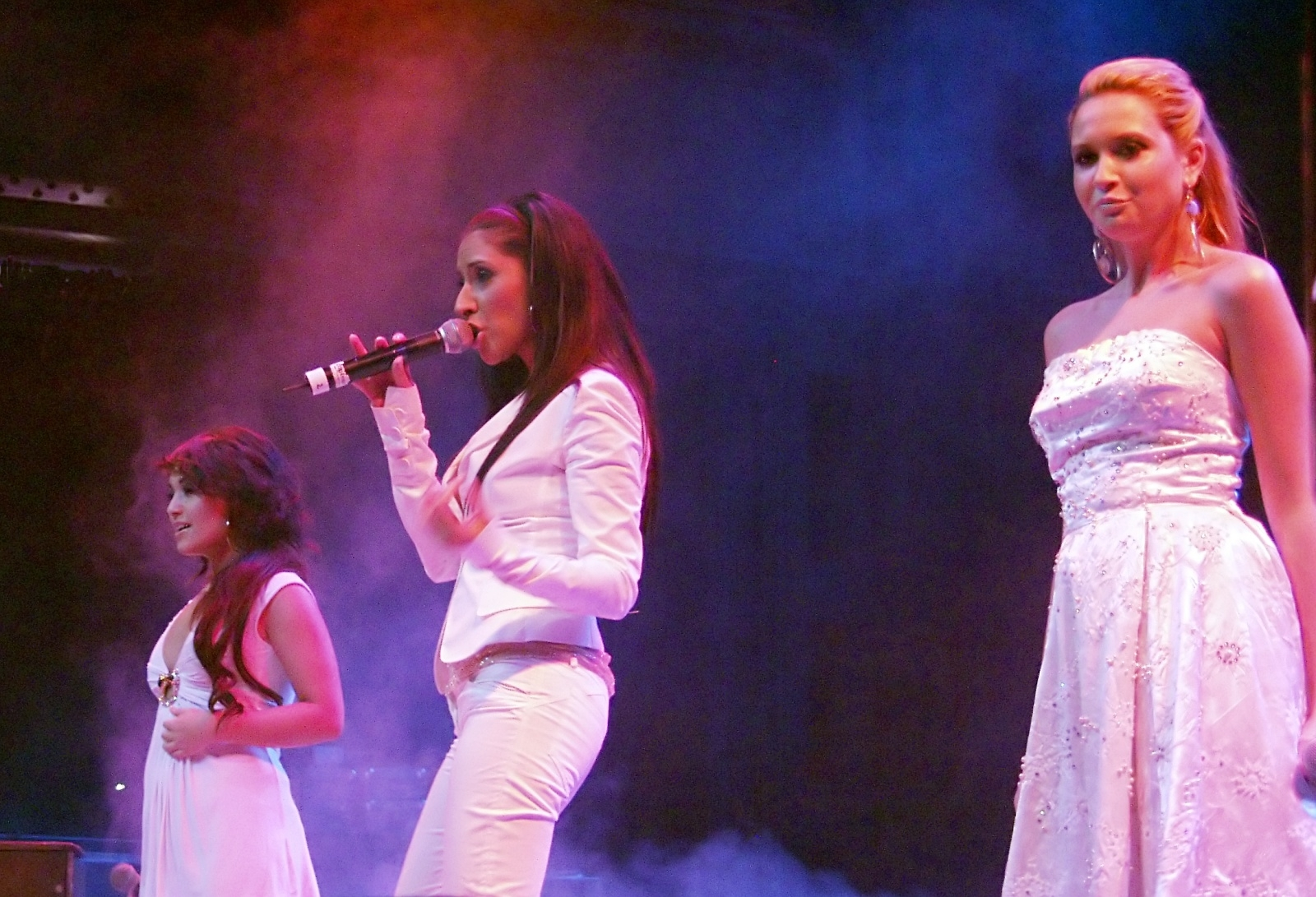
Monrose during a charity concert in Cologne, Germany, in November 2007

On 1 December 2006, Monrose released their debut single "Shame". Produced by Jiant and Snowflakers, the song became an instant success and reached number one in Austria, Germany, and Switzerland, making it one of the most successful debuts of the year. Outselling 3/4 of the German Top 100's singles sales combined, the song also emerged as the fastest selling CD single of 2006 and the biggest-downloaded song since the introduction of the legal download charts in Germany in 2004. The band's debut album Temptation was released on 8 December in all German-speaking countries. Popstars judge Dieter Falk, Toni Cottura, Marc Mozart, and Marcus Brosch consulted on the album which debuted on top of the Austrian, German and Swiss albums charts and was certified platinum by the IFPI for more than 200,000 copies sold within its first two weeks of release. It eventually sold more than 600,000 copies domestically. Critics rated Temptation generally positively, with laut.de's Stefan Johannesburg praising Monrose and their team for wisely finding a very "British and catchy" musical middle ground between the Pussycat Dolls and Destiny's Child.

In January 2007, it was announced that the trio had qualified for the German national pre-selection of the Eurovision Song Contest 2007, organized and broadcast by the ARD. Following several weeks of promotional appearances, Monrose entered the competition on 8 March 2007 with their second single "Even Heaven Cries", and although considered as early favourites by the media, the band received 20 per cent of all 900,000 phone votes only and eventually finished second, falling against swing singer Roger Cicero and his song "Frauen regier'n die Welt". Meanwhile, "Even Heaven Cries" peaked at number 6 on the German Singles Chart and within the top 20 in Austria and Switzerland. Following this, the band announced their Venus Temptation Tour with 20 dates, beginning at the Hanover Capitol on 29 April 2007. Sponsored by Global Gillette, the concert tour was accompanied by intense media coverage since it failed to produce any sold-out show, and thus four concerts had to be cancelled due to low ticket sales.

=== 2007–2008: Strictly Physical and I Am ===
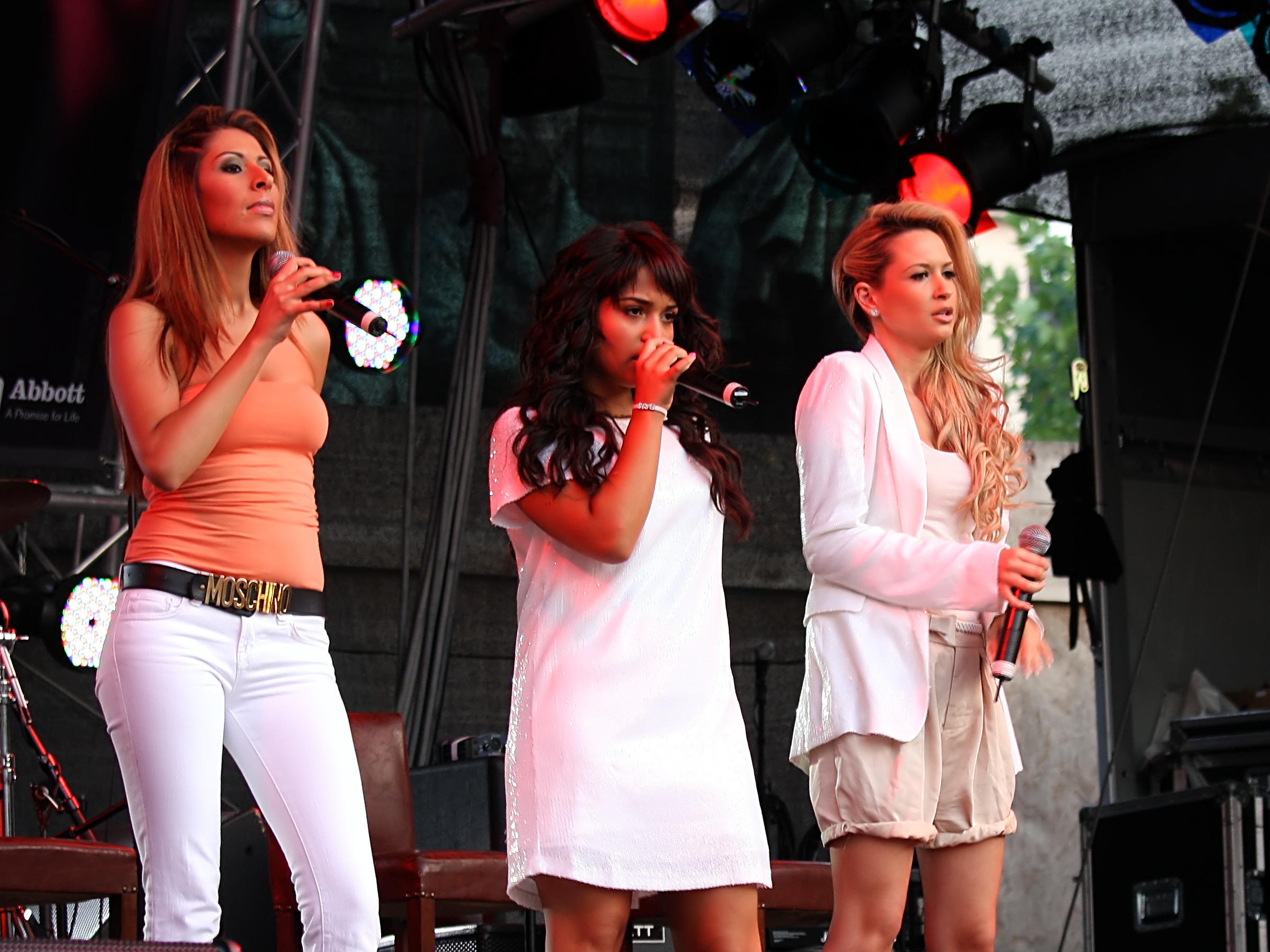
Monrose performing at the Cologne Pride 2009 in July 2009

While touring, Monrose began preparing work on their second studio album, Strictly Physical, which was preceded by the single "Hot Summer", the band's second number-one hit in Austria, Germany and Switzerland, and one of the biggest-selling songs of the year on German online music stores. Obtaining international success in Scandinavia, Eastern Europe, and the Benelux states, the single confirmed the trio's intentions to expand their career on foreign language markets, and as a result, Strictly Physical received a simultaneous release in most of Continental Europe on 21 September 2007. Featuring main production by Danish producers Remee and Thomas Troelsen, the album earned mixed reviews, with most professional critics calling the longplayer a "more mature and individual" but "well-snitched" output in comparison with band's debut album. With "Strictly Physical" and the Billymann-penned ballad "What You Don't Know" the album spawned another two top 10 entries.

On 1 September, Monrose contested in the Sopot Song Festival 2007 in Poland, representing Germany with their debut single "Shame". Rivaled by other international artists such as Sophie Ellis-Bextor, Thierry Amiel, The Cloud Room, and September, the trio eventually lost to Polish rock band Feel and their song "A gdy już jest ciemno".

On 20 March 2008, Monrose' non-album song "We Love", a promotional song for German-based network ProSieben, was released as a digital download single. The trio's third studio album, I Am, was released on 26 September 2008 in German-speaking Europe, involving production by Ryan Tedder, Jiant, and Snowflakers among others. Taking Monrose's work further into dance and electro music, the album scored a generally negative reception from music critics, with laut.de calling them "the new Sugababes for discount store-fans". Upon its release, the album became the band's lowest-charting effort to date, reaching the top ten of the German Albums Chart only. The album's leading single, Tedder-penned "Strike the Match", was released on 6 June 2008 and reached number ten of the German Singles Chart. Follow-up singles "Hit 'n' Run" and "Why Not Us" ended the run of the band's consecutive top ten entries in Germany with peak positions of number 16 and number 27, respectively.

Also in 2008, the band contributed vocals to a cover version of singer Craig David's number-one hit "Walking Away". Although David and the band shot the video in London, England in July 2008, the single release of the re-recording was eventually scrapped.

=== 2009–2011: Hiatus and Ladylike ===
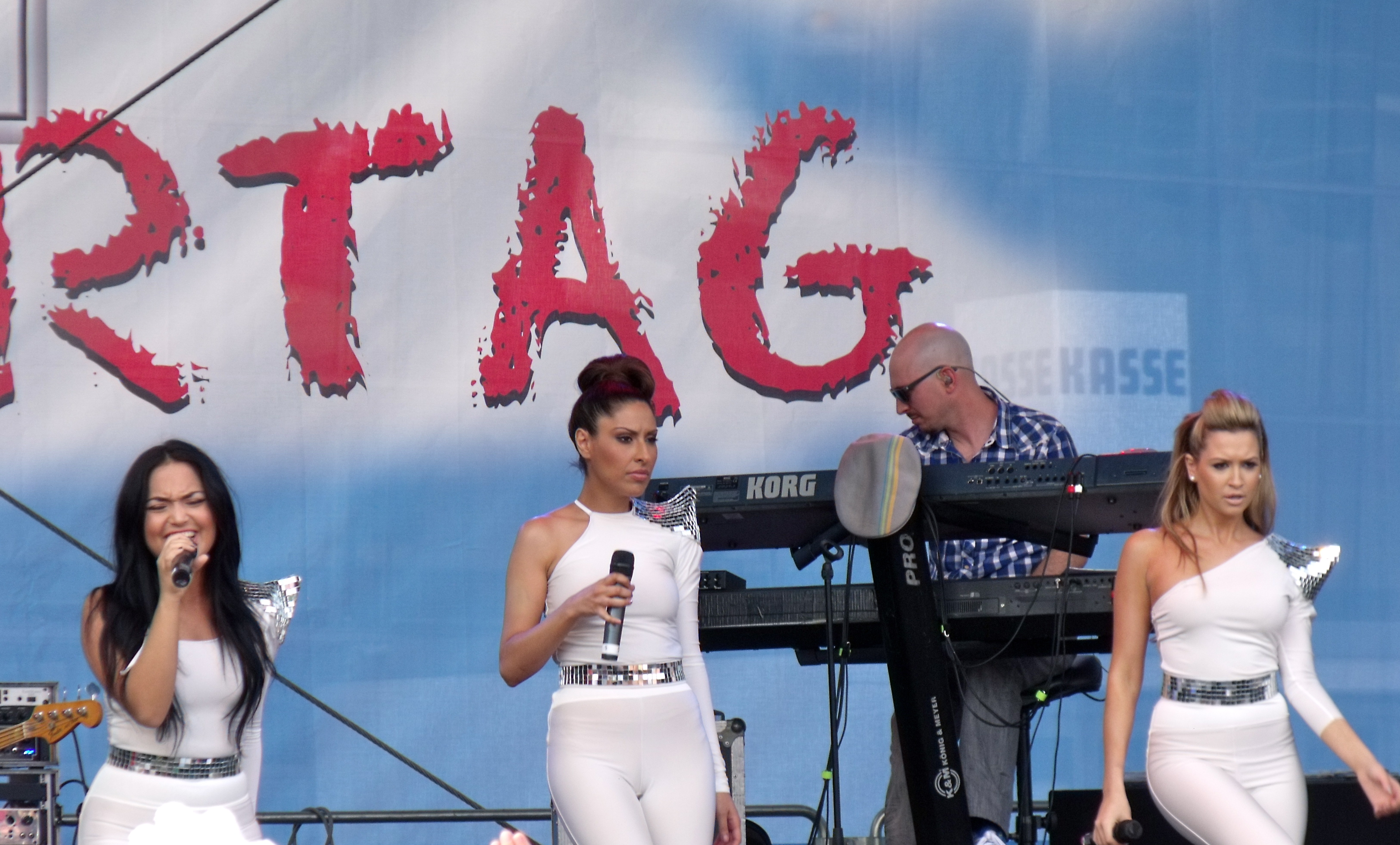
Monrose promoting Ladylike at the FFN Kindertag in June 2010

Following a short hiatus, the band announced the release of their fourth album in February 2010. Recorded in Germany and New York City, Monrose reunited with previous collaborators such as Pete Kirtley, Tim Hawes, Chris Ballard and Alexander Geringas to work on the record, which was eventually entitled Ladylike and released on 11 June 2010 in German-speaking Europe. It debuted at number ten on the German Albums Chart and became the group's fourth consecutive top ten album. Leading single "Like a Lady" debuted at number fourteen on the German Singles Chart and peaked at number nine on the chart, making it the group's seventh non-consecutive top ten hit. A second single off the album, "This Is Me", was released in August 2010 and managed to enter the top 30.

On 23 November, the band celebrate their four years existence of Monrose. Two days later, on 25 November 2010, they announced their separation. The third single from Ladylike, titled "Breathe You In", served as the final single. In February 2011, it was announced that Monrose received an Echo nomination in the category Video of the Year for "Like a Lady".

== Members ==
Members	2006	2007	2008	2009	2010	2011
Mandy Capristo	2006–2011					
Senna Gammour	2006–2011					
Bahar Kızıl	2006–2011					

== Discography ==
=== Studio albums ===
- Temptation (2006)
- Strictly Physical (2007)
- I Am (2008)
- Ladylike (2010)

== Tours ==
- Venus Temptation Tour (29 April – 5 June 2007)
- Club Tour (2009)

== Awards and nominations ==
=== Results ===
Year	Award	Category	Work	Result
2006	Bravo Otto Awards	Band Pop	Themself	Silver
2007	Bravo Otto Awards	Band Pop	Themself	Silver
2007	Viva Comet	Best Newcomer	Themself	Nominated
2007	Echo Awards	Group of the Year (national)	Themself	Nominated
2007	Echo Awards	Newcomer of the Year (national)	Themself	Nominated
2007	Nickelodeon Kids Choice Awards (German)	Favourite Band	Themself	Nominated
2008	Viva Comet	Best Song	Hot Summer	Won
2008	Viva Comet	Best Band	Themself	Nominated
2008	Bravo Otto Awards	Best Band	Themself	Bronze
2008	Jetix Kids Awards	Best Band	Themself	Nominated
2008	Nickelodeon Kids Choice Awards (German)	Favourite Band	Themself	Nominated
2009	Vivalicious Awards	Best Style	Themself	Won
2009	Viva Comet	Best Band	Themself	Won
2009	Viva Comet	Star of the Stars	Themself	Nominated
2009	Bravo Otto Awards	Best Band	Themself	Silver
2010	Bravo Otto Awards	Best Band	Themself	Bronze
2010	Nickelodeon Kids Choice Awards (German)	Favourite Musician	Themself	Nominated
2010	Wild And Young Awards	Best Band (national)	Themself	Bronze
2010	Wild And Young Awards	Best Album (national)	Ladylike	Silver
2011	Viva Comet	Best Band	Themself	Nominated
2011	Echo Awards	Best Video (national)	Like A Lady	Nominated

== Other music information ==
SM Entertainment, the company responsible for the South Korean group F(x), bought the rights of the song "Hot Summer", transforming it into a single in 2011.

== See also ==
- List of best-selling girl groups
