= Mozart & Friends =

- Genres: Pop; R&B; hip hop
- Occupation: Producers
- Years active: 2006–present
- Members: Alexander Gernert; Alexander Krause; Dominik Rothert; Jason Worthy; Jessica Jean Pfeiffer; Johannes Burmann; Marc Mozart

Mozart & Friends is a record production and songwriting team working in the genres of pop, R&B and hip hop.

== Members ==
The team was founded in 2006 and consists of producers and songwriters located in different countries:

- German mix-engineer, songwriter and producer Marc Mozart ("Mixed by Marc Mozart").
- US-based Doctor Fink, keyboard player of Prince's first band
- US-based J. Worthy, official remixer for No Angels single "Teardrops"
- Austria-based Patrick Flo Macheck, official remixer of the German No. 1 single "Hot Summer"
- Melbourne, Australia-based producer and songwriter Alf Tuohey, official remixer for No Angels single "Disappear"
- German-based producer-songwriter Manuel Loyo, official remixer for No Angels single "Disappear"
- German-based producer-songwriter Alexander Gernert, official remixer for No Angels single "Disappear"
- Hamburg, Germany-based producer-songwriter Alexander Hahn, official remixer for No Angels single "Disappear"
- German-based lyricist-songwriter Alexander "Indy" Krause

== Partial discography ==
=== Selected songs and productions ===
2011

- "One Thousand Voices" by The Voice of Holland - songwriting (Alfred Tuohey), publishing (Mozart & Friends)

2009

- "Disappear" by No Angels - remix production for official remixes:

Yin Yang RMX, Chartlab House RMX, Soundbomb House RMX

2007

- "Take a Minute" by Room 2012 - production, songwriting
- "Family Song" by Jimi Blue - production, songwriting
- "Who's That Girl" by Jimi Blue - production, songwriting
- "All Alone" by Jimi Blue - production, songwriting
- "Party in the City" by Jimi Blue - production, songwriting
- "Never Give Up" by Popstars on Stage Allstars - production, songwriting
- "Allstars" by Popstars on Stage - album production
- "Teardrops" by No Angels - remix production
- "Real Man" by Lexington Bridge feat. Snoop Dogg - remix production
- "I'm Lovin... (l.r.h.p.)" by Jimi Blue - remix production
- "Hot Summer" by Monrose - official remix
- "Diamonds and Pearls" by Monrose - production, mixing
- "Push Up on Me" by Monrose - production, mixing
- "Two of a Kind" by Monrose - co-production
