= Mandy Capristo =

German pop singer

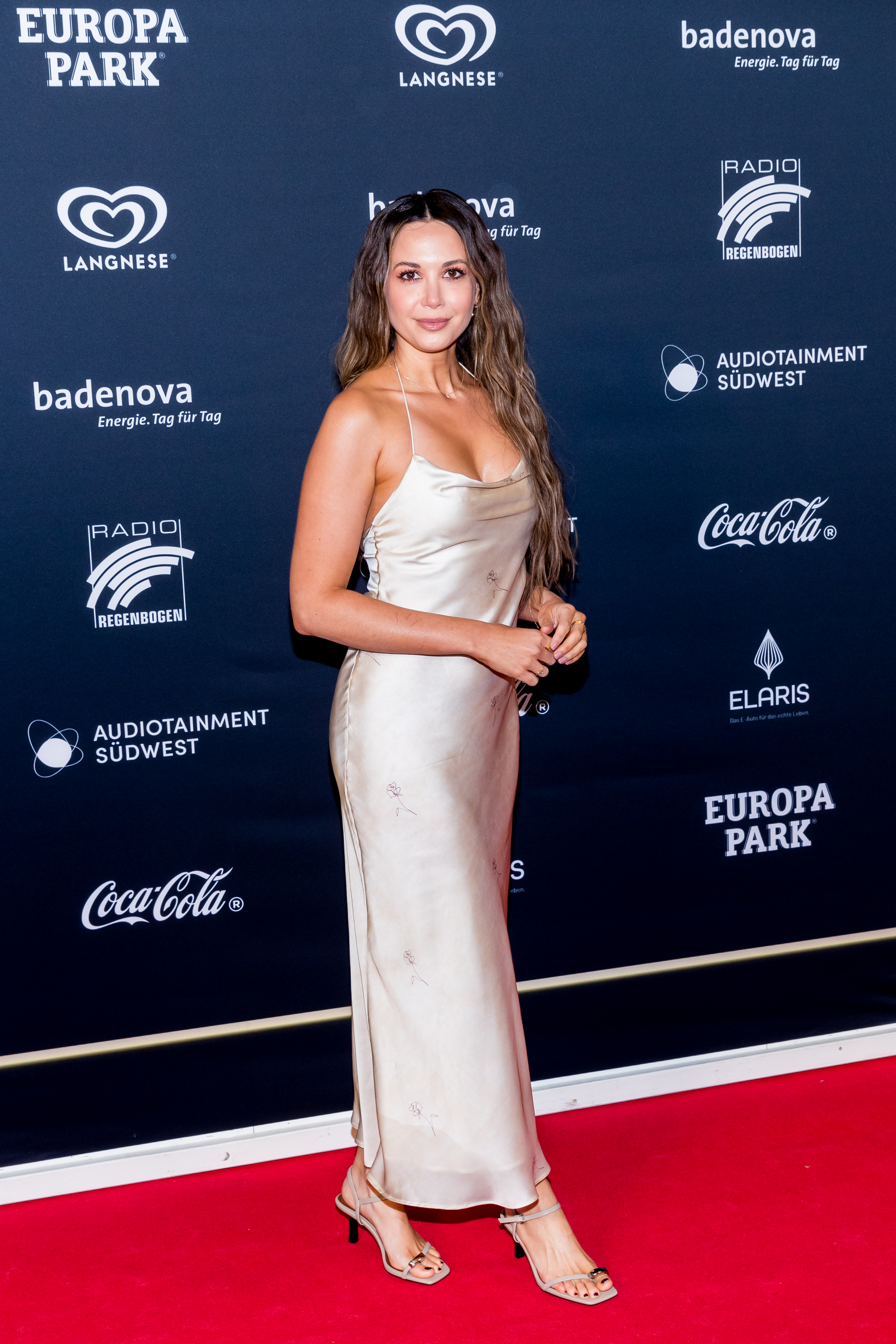
- Capristo in 2024

Background information
- Also known as: Grace Capristo
- Born: Mandy Grace Capristo; 21 March 1990 (age 36); Mannheim, West-Germany
- Genres: Pop, dance-pop, soul, R&B
- Occupations: Singer; songwriter
- Years active: 2001-present
- Labels: Starwatch; Universal; EMI; Warner
- Formerly of: Monrose

Mandy Grace Capristo (born 21 March 1990), also known mononymously as Mandy, is a German singer and songwriter.

Born in Mannheim and raised in Bürstadt, Capristo was first exposed to singing and dancing competitions in 2001, when she won Kiddy Contest, a reality television singing competition for teens in Austria, with her song Ich wünsche mir einen Bankomat. In the mid to late 2000s, Capristo rose to fame as a founding member of the girl band Monrose, the result of the fifth season of the German television talent show Popstars. Until their disbandment in 2011, the trio released four studio albums and 11 singles.

Following the breakup of Monrose, Capristo launched her solo career as a singer. In 2011, she collaborated with singer Peter Maffay on his Tabaluga musical track Die Zeit hält nur in Träumen an. In between recording her first solo album Grace (2012), Capristo participated in the fifth season of Let's Dance. Her first solo single, "The Way I like it", was released in April 2012.

== Life and career ==
=== Early life and career beginnings ===
Mandy Grace Capristo was born in Mannheim, the daughter of an Italian father, Vittorio Capristo, and a German mother, Carmen. She grew up in Bürstadt. Her older brother, Anthony, was born in 1986. Her parents separated when she was in her early teens. Capristo was four when she began gymnastics, dance, and piano lessons. Three years later, she enrolled in dancing. In 2001, Capristo's music teacher entered her for the Kiddy Contest in Austria. She won the competition with her song "Ich wünsche mir einen Bankomat", which subsequently appeared on the number-one compilation album Kiddy Contest, Vol. 7 (2001). Capristo appeared in shows such as Tabaluga Tivi or 1, 2, or 3, and in 2002, she recorded the song "Mosquito" for another Kiddy Contest album.

=== 2006-2010: Monrose and modeling ===
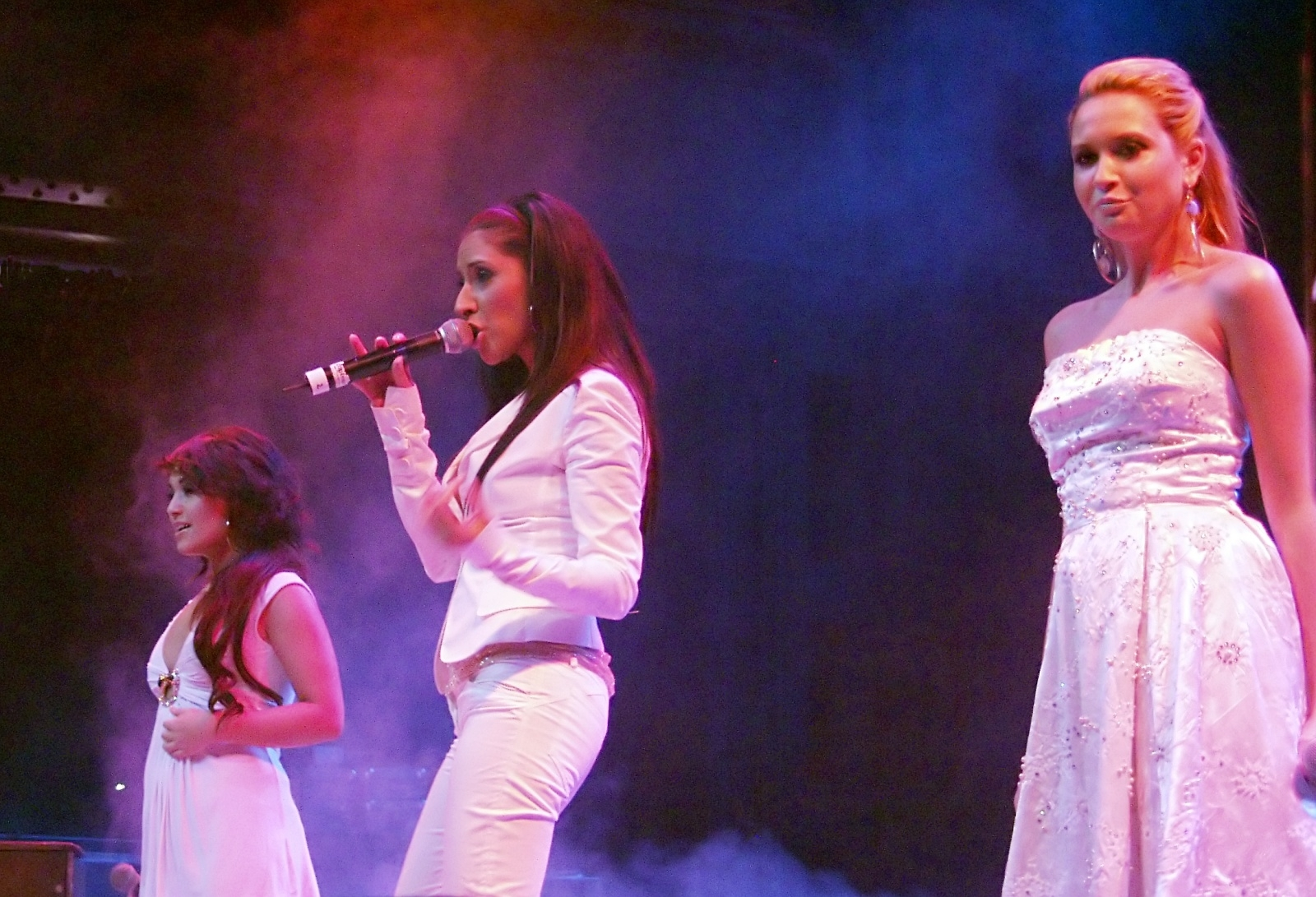
Monrose at the Cover Me charity concert in Cologne, Germany in 2007

In 2006, Capristo decided to participate in the German television show Popstars on the ProSieben network. At the finale, the audience chose Capristo via televoting to become the final member of the girl band trio Monrose alongside Senna Gammour and Bahar Kızıl. The group's debut single Shame peaked at number one on the German singles chart and became one of the best-selling singles of the year, resulting in a sales total of 200,000 copies Europe-wide. The group released their debut album Temptation in December 2006, which debuted on the charts at number one and was certified two times platinum by the Media Control Charts in 2007. Since 2006, the girl group released four studio albums, Temptation, Strictly Physical, I Am, and Ladylike which entered the charts in the top 10. Their singles "Shame" and "Hot Summer" have charted at number one. Overall, they released eleven singles, which seven of eleven reached the Top 10 in the German Charts. In 2008, they won their first Comet Award for Best Single with "Hot Summer" and in 2009 for Best Band.

In June 2010, Capristo featured on the German cover of FHM magazine and posed in the same calendar.

On 25 November 2010, Monrose announced that the group would split and each focus on their solo projects. The last official TV appearance Monrose had was on 27 February 2011 with their single "Like a Lady" at the finale of Austria's Next Topmodel.

=== 2011-2020: Solo career ===
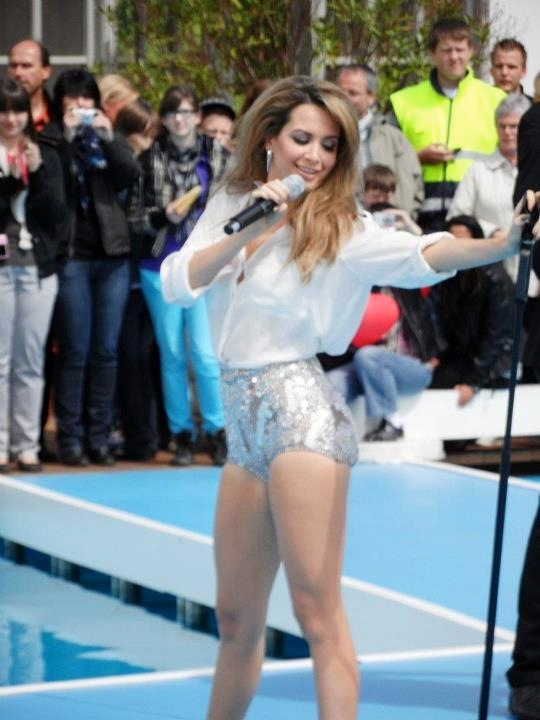
Capristo in 2012

After the disbanding of Monrose, Capristo confirmed in an interview that she already started recording for her first album in November 2010. In May 2011, she performed two songs off her first album. One track called "Be You", it will be the B-Side of her first single and it was written for the Be-Yu Cosmetics. The other song is called Overrated which will also appear on the album. Because of a cooperation with Peter Maffay, they recorded the song "Die Zeit hält nur in Träumen an" (German) and performed on 8 October at Wetten, dass..? and in October 2012, the singer went on Tabaluga-Tour with Peter Maffay. The single with Peter debuted at number 86 in the German Charts.

In March 2012, Mandy announced her first solo single "The Way I like it" (written and produced by David Jost), would be released on 13 April. Her first album was to be called Grace. The album was released on 27 April under her new record label EMI and Starwatch Entertainment. As her second single she released a song called "Closer", written by Robin Grubert and Martin Tingvall.

On 14 March 2012, she took part in the dance show Let's Dance with professional dancer Stefano Terrazzino, the German version of Dancing with the Stars.

In 2016, she changed her artist name to Grace Capristo and released her single "One Woman Army", written by American songwriter and producer PJ Bianco, P. Bentley, Aimée Proal and Capristo, to moderate success. On 28 October 2016, she released a song called "Ricorderai l'Amore (Remember the Love)" with Italian singer Marco Mengoni.

In 2018, she took her old name Mandy Capristo back and released with singer Larsito her song "Si es amor", which debuted at number 52 in the German Charts for one week.

In September 2020, she released her first German single via Warner Music, titled "13 Schritte", and the second German single "Genug“ followed in March 2021. In 2022 she published her first book "An erster Stelle bin ich Mensch!“ ("In the first place, I am human!“) with the publishing-house Komplett-Media. In it, she talks about her anxiety and why she no longer dared to go on stage as a result. Since speaking out publicly, she has been performing again.

== Artistry ==
=== Music and voice ===
Capristo has published songs in English; only for the Tabaluga project and the feature film Tangled (with Monrose) has she sung in German. She also sang the song Grace in Italian, although she does not speak that language. A complete production of their songs was used in acoustic versions. In 2016, she also released a track called "Ricorderai l'Amore (Ricorderai l'Amore)" with Italian singer Marco Mengoni, where she sung an Italian part. Capristo said, "I feel most comfortable with English, because I personally think that my voice sounds at its best. Although German is my native language, I feel more comfortable in English". In addition, she added: "It is very important that I decide my projects." In a review of the album Grace, the music magazine Laut.de wrote: "Grace is a nice debut-intentioned work, but which, unfortunately, proves that the chick from Monrose-targeted new style does not get paid on album length. [...] It don't matter and the acoustic session was the best, without all the trappings actually show her vocal talent." CD Bewertungen.de: "Her fans can look deep into her soul and makes clear that a lot is just smoke and mirrors as well as a "Star" has its problems, is lonely, has been violated." The British magazine Popjustice wrote: "We love it in a very deep and pure way, of course, but we were hoping Mandy's album Grace would contain so many extraordinary tunes that we could make one of them a Big Song instead. The Way I Like It gets its time in the sun after all, and that's not a completely bad thing because it is, of course, a cracker.

=== Influences ===
Capristo called Beyoncé as her musical influence, and her idol. She sang "If I were a Boy" at the Comet music award show. She also called Whitney Houston as another influence, because of her, she has started to sing. She also said: "Destiny's Child has accompanied me all my life, and so I made my first steps into music. I also listen to India Arie and Sade Adu." Eventually, she wants to work with them. Other musical influences are Rihanna and Nicole Scherzinger. In addition, she got experience with Peter Maffay and learned the major foundations for her solo career from him.

=== Advertising-contracts ===
In 2007, Capristo signed an advertising contract with Gillette Venus. That same year, Capristo modeled for the fashion-brand Ed Hardy. In 2008, Capristo filmed commercials for ProSieben. There, she presented the We love Collection, a cooperation with Otto. In October 2008, Capristo was the testimonial for the Nintendo DS game Just 4 Girls. The following year, Capristo modeled for the Otto catalog and was on the cover. In spring of 2010, she had completed a two-year contract with the cosmetics brand BeYu. She also modeled for companies like Mercedes and L'Oréal.

== Social commitment ==
In 2007, Capristo occurred on Schau nicht weg!, a concert that is opposed to violence. It was a campaign of the magazine Bravo which the young people should arrange to deal with issues such as social hot spots, violent conflict or bullying. In 2008, Capristo was an ambassador of the Federal Foundation for Children's Hospice, supporting the issue climate-change with the Climmate Fashion programme as a judge. For this, the fashion designers made the clothes exclusively with environmental-friendly and sustainable materials. In addition, Capristo was since 2011 in the context of Germany's relief for victims of famine in East-Africa. Capristo said: "It is important for me, especially in this superficial world, where we live, and forget in this superficial business, to make a positive use of it."

== Personal life ==
Capristo started dating German football player Mesut Özil in 2013. The relationship ended in October 2014, following reports of Özil being involved with another woman. On 12 November 2015, Özil and Capristo appeared together at the Bambi awards ceremony in Berlin.

== Discography ==
=== Studio albums ===
- Grace (2012)

== Awards and nominations ==
=== Results ===
Year	Award	Category	Work	Result	Ref.
2007	FHM Germany	100 Sexiest Women in the World	Herself	10th	
2009	FHM Germany	100 Sexiest Women in the World	Herself	1st	
2013	Echo Awards	Female Artist National Rock/Pop	Grace	Nominated	
2013	Echo Awards	Best Video National	The Way I Like It	Shortlisted	
2015	Nickelodeon Kids' Choice Awards	Favorite Star: Germany, Austria, Switzerland	Herself	Won	
2015	Madonna Leading Ladies Awards	Entertainment	Herself	Won	
2016	InTouch Magazine Awards	Idols & Icon Award: Singer National	Herself	Won	

== Tours ==
- The Graceful Acoustic Tour (2012)
- Tabaluga-Tour (2012)
- Disney Musical "Aladdin" (2018)

== Filmography ==
=== Film ===
Year	Title	Role	Notes
2012	Secret of the Wings	Periwinkle	German voice role

=== Television ===
Year	Title	Role	Notes
2011	Fish Hooks	Pamela Hamster	German voice role
2012	The Dome 61	Herself	TV host
2012	Let's Dance	Herself	Participant
2015	Deutschland sucht den Superstar	Herself	Judge; Season 12
2020	Sturm der Liebe	Herself	Guest role; 1 episode
2024	The Masked Singer	Herself	Participant
