= Dieter Falk =

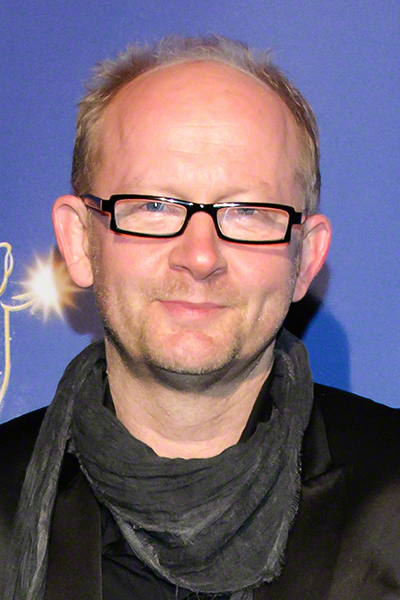
- Falk in 2013

Background information
- Born: 5 December 1959 (age 66); Klafeld-Geisweid, West Germany
- Genres: Pop, jazz
- Occupations: Musician, record producer, composer, arranger
- Instruments: Keyboards, piano
- Years active: 1985–present
- Label: Stereo Wonderland
- Website: falk-music.de

Dieter Falk (born 5 December 1959 in Klafeld-Geisweid, now Siegen) is a German music producer, keyboardist, Christian composer, and arranger.

== Discography ==
- 1985: On Time
- 1985: Instrumental Journey
- 1987: Today
- 1989: Dieter Falk
- 1994: Colours
- 2006: A Tribute to Paul Gerhardt
- 2007: Volkslieder
- 2009: Die 10 Gebote ("The Ten Commandments")
- 2011: Falk & Sons Celebrate Bach (with his sons)
