= Senna Gammour =

German pop singer (born 1979)

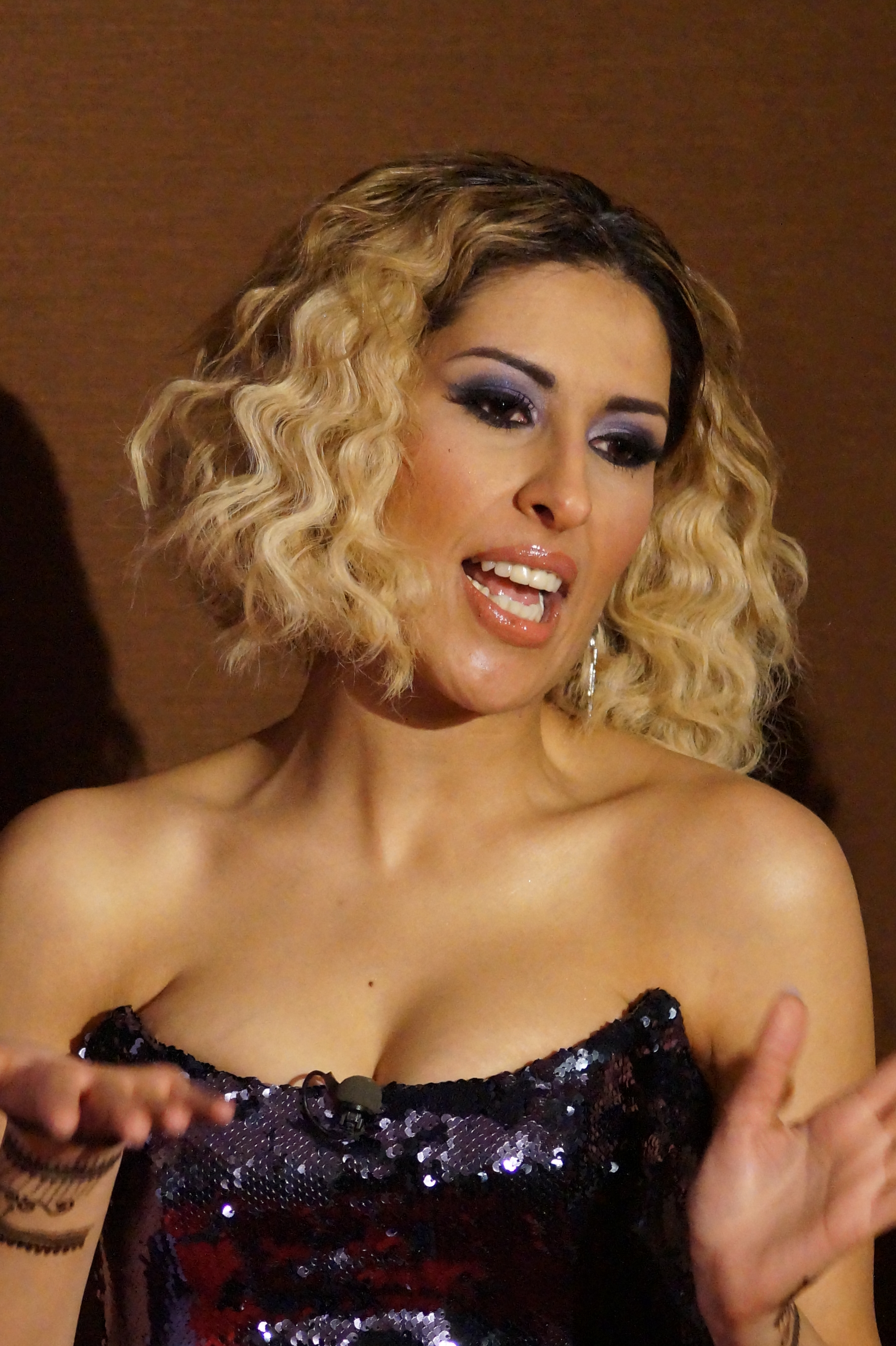
- Gammour in 2015

Background information
- Also known as: Senna; Sista Senna
- Born: Senna Guemmour; 28 December 1979 (age 46); Frankfurt, West Germany
- Genres: Pop; dance-pop; R&B; German hip hop
- Occupations: Singer; TV presenter
- Years active: 2006–present
- Formerly of: Monrose

Senna Gammour (née Guemmour; born 28 December 1979), also known mononymously as Senna, is a German singer, television personality and presenter. She was a member of the girl group Monrose.

== Early life ==
Gammour was born in Frankfurt to a Moroccan mother and Algerian father. She grew up in the housing estate of Frankfurt-Nordweststadt. Gammour's father died in 1992. Shaped by her life in the urban area, Gammour became interested in hip hop culture and music; she also worked as a waitress and started a commercial training in the wholesale and export trades.

== Career ==
In 2003, Gammour auditioned for the television show Popstars – Das Duell, but was eliminated during the callback. In 2006, she auditioned again, this time for Popstars – Neue Engel braucht das Land, where she made it throughout the entire competition and became a member of the girl group Monrose. The group turned out to be very popular, attaining two number-one singles on the German Singles Charts ("Shame" and "Hot Summer") and landing a total of seven top 10 hits, of which six of them were attained before 2008.

In 2007, Gammour collaborated with German musician Dieter Falk on the track "Kein schöner Land", from his album Volkslieder. The following year, she was featured on German rapper Kool Savas' single "Melodie", which reached a peak position of 68 on the Official German Charts.

On 9 September 2008, she, along with Oliver Petszokat, began hosting the German edition of The Singing Bee on television channel ProSieben; the program ran until early 2009. Furthermore, she served as a judge on the German talent show Mascerade.

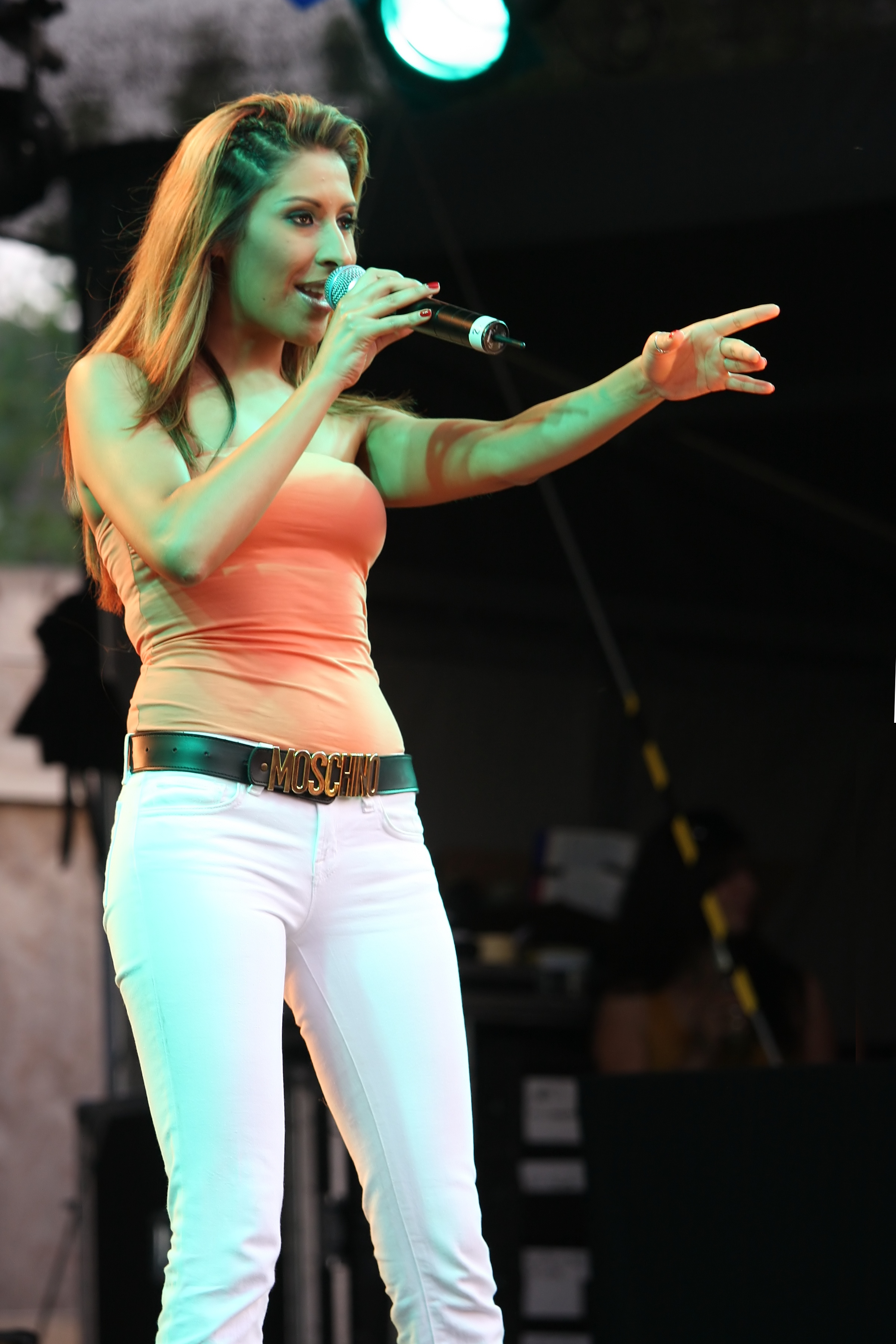
Gammour performing with Monrose at Cologne Pride (July 2009)

On 25 November 2010, Monrose announced that they would disband in early 2011. Gammour would later continue her career as a television presenter by co-hosting the German version of Deal With It (known as Iss oder Quizz) with Lutz van der Horst; the program aired on ZDFneo for 56 episodes between March 2011 and March 2012.

Gammour served as a judge on the tenth season of Popstars, which aired on ProSieben in the summer of 2012.

During 2012 and 2018, Gammour participated in many TV shows like Promi Shopping Queen, Wild Girls – Auf High Heels durch Afrika, Grill den Hessler or Genial daneben – Das Quiz. In 2017, she started her own comedy tour Liebeskummer ist ein Arschloch!, which became successful. One year later, she began touring her second show called No More Fuckboys! and performed in Germany, Austria and Switzerland.

During the next three years, she published two books (Liebeskummer ist ein Arschloch – Nie wieder Fuckboys and In dein Gesicht – Erfolg ist die beste Rache!) and released her singles "Fuckboy", "Anders Real" and "Wahnsinnig".

== Discography ==
=== Singles ===
==== As lead artist ====
Title	Year	Album
"Fuckboy"	2020	Non-album singles
"Anders Real"	2020	Non-album singles
"Wahnsinnig"	2020	Non-album singles
"Break Ups" (with Liz)	2021	Non-album singles

==== As featured artist ====
Title	Year	Peaks	Album
Title	Year	GER	Album
"Kein Schöner Land" (Dieter Falk featuring Senna)	2007	—	Volkslieder
"Melodie" (Kool Savas featuring Senna and Moe Mitchell)	2008	68	Tot oder lebendig
"Du kannst diesen Weg nicht alleine gehen" (Massiv featuring Senna)	2009	—	Der Ghettotraum in Handarbeit
"Run" (Gammour featuring Senna)	2010	—	Twizla'r

== Filmography ==
=== Film ===
Year	Title	Role	Notes
2015	Nur nicht aufregen!	Aylin Beyerling	
2019	The Secret Life of Pets 2	Daisy	Voice role
2020	Tyler Rake: Watch Buddy	Herself	Released on YouTube and Netflix

=== Television ===
Year	Title	Role	Notes
2008–2009	Singing Bee	Herself	TV host
2008–2009	VIVA Live!	Sista Senna	TV host
2009	Mascerade – Deutschland verbiegt sich	Herself	Judge
2009	The Next Uri Geller	Herself	Guest, 1 episode
2009	Yes We Can Dance	Herself	Participant
2010	Helden von Morgen	Herself	Coach, 1 episode
2011–2012	Iss oder quiz	Herself	56 episodes; TV host
2012	Popstars	Herself	Judge
2012	Lafer! Lichter! Lecker!	Herself	Guest, 1 episode
2013	Wild Girls – Auf High Heels durch Afrika	Herself	Participant, 4 episodes
2013–2019	Promi Shopping Queen	Herself	3 episodes
2014	Promis suchen ein Zuhause	Herself	1 episode
2014	Jungen gegen Mädchen	Herself	Guest, 1 episode
2014	Die Promi-Lektion	Herself	Episode: "Macht Senna heiratsfähig"
2016	Cover Up – Wir retten dein Tattoo	Herself	1 episode
2016–2017	Grill den Hessler	Herself	Guest, 2 episodes
2019	Genial daneben – Das Quiz	Herself	Guest, 1 episode
2021	Let's Dance	Herself	Contestant, eliminated in week 3 - 12th place

=== Webseries ===
Year	Title	Role	Notes
2019–present	Let's Get Real	Herself	4 episodes; published on YouTube

=== Podcast ===
Year	Title	Notes	Release
2021-2022	Zuckerwatte	with Seyda Taygur	On Spotify
2022	Frag die Abla		On Spotify

== Books ==
- Liebeskummer ist ein Arschloch – Nie wieder Fuckboys (ISBN 978-3-548-06051-4) [2019]
- In dein Gesicht – Erfolg ist die beste Rache! (ISBN 978-3-548-06224-2) [2020]
- Liebeskummer lohnt sich, my darling (ISBN 978-3-442-18023-3) [2024]

== Tours ==
=== Headliner ===
- Liebeskummer ist ein Arschloch! (2017-2018)
- No More Fuckboys! (2019)
- No More Fuckboys! 2.0 (2020) [some dates cancelled due COVID-19 pandemic]
- Was Frauen wirklich wollen - die Akte Ex Tour (2023)
- Der Schöne und das Biest - Frag die Abla Podcast Tour (2024) [mit Sunny Vizion]
- Toxisch aber Süss Tour (2025)

== Awards and nominations ==
Year	Award	Category	Work	Result	Ref.
2018	Act Comedy Awards Switzerland	German Comedian	Herself	Won	
2019	Spitzenfeder Awards	Paperback/Advisor	Liebeskummer ist ein Arschloch — Nie wieder fuckboys	Won	
