= Ladylike =

Studio album by Monrose
- Released: 11 June 2010
- Length: 47:38
- Label: Starwatch; Cheyenne; Warner
- Producer: Various: Bülent Aris; Chris Ballard; Marcus Brosch; Christian "TheFatRat" Buettner; Alexander Geringas; Tim Hawes; Elias Kapari; Pete Kirtley; Obi Mhondera; Tobias Neumann; Will Simms; Marcello Pagin; Tuneverse

Monrose chronology
I Am (2008)	Ladylike (2010)

Singles from Ladylike
- 1. "Like a Lady" Released: 28 May 2010; 2. "This Is Me" Released: 27 August 2010; 3. "Breathe You In" Released: 3 December 2010

Ladylike is the fourth and final studio album by German pop trio Monrose. It was released by Starwatch Music in association with Cheyenne Records and the Warner Music Group on 11 June 2010 in German-speaking Europe. Conceived during a hiatus which allowed each member to launch solo projects, production of the album began in mid-2009. Unlike their previous material, recording of Ladylike was not rushed, with sessions also taking place in New York City. Monrose reteamed with frequent collaborators Pete Kirtley, Tim Hawes, and Obi Mhondera to work on the album, while upcoming producers such as Tuneverse and Alexander Geringas were also consulted.

Pursuing a new musical direction, Ladylike took the group's work further into the dance pop, synthpop and electronic genres, marking a departure from the contemporary R&B-influenced sound of previous projects prior to I Am in favor of a more international sound. Elaborating a sophisticated theme for the album, the band requested promotional material to depict a darker, more mature image. Ladylike was released to generally mixed reviews from music critics, many of whom praised the slower songs on the album but found the rest of the material too generic.

On the charts, the album peaked at number ten on the German Albums Chart, becoming Monrose's fourth consecutive top ten album to do so. It also entered the top thirty in Austria and Switzerland, eventually selling 30,000 copies within the first five months of release. In promotion of the album, Starwatch released three singles from Ladylike, including the band's seventh top ten hit "Like a Lady" and follow-up "This Is Me". Following Monrose's announcement of their disbandment in fall 2010, album track "Breathe You In",Ladylike's third single, also served as the group's farewell single.

== Background ==
Following the release of the final single from their third album I Am (2008), "Why Not Us," in November 2008, the Monrose members decided to take a break from music business, during which the trio pursued different branches of the entertainment industry. In summer 2009, they eventually reunited to start work on their fourth studio album Ladylike, which was partially recorded in Germany and in New York City. The three members agreed that recording overseas was very "inspiring." Bahar Kizil commented, that "recording an album in a city like New York, means putting yourself on a higher level." The songs that were recorded there include "Superstar DJ" and "Don't Take It Personal." In the end, the group reportedly had the highest number of songs to choose from, as in two years of break, a lot of new material had been collected. The songs for the final track list were chosen by the band members, as well as their families and friends. The trio appreciated the break of two years between their third and fourth album releases. Senna Guemmour explained, that in this way, the recording sessions were very relaxed and could be done without any stress.

== Promotion ==
The first new song introduced from Ladylike was Billy Burnette-penned "All or Nothing," premiered during a fan club meeting. The second song was "Superstar DJ," co-written by Alistair Tennant, which was first performed during a promotional event for Douglas fragrances. Monrose first presented "This Is Me," along with the Donna Summer cover "On the Radio" at the Thomas & Helga Show on NDR. The lead single "Like a Lady" was sent to radios on 17 April 2010. The music video had its premiere on 12 May 2010. The song was also performed during the season finale of the fifth season of Germany's Next Topmodel.

== Reception ==
Professional ratings
Review scores
Source	Rating
CDStarts	5/10 stars
laut.de	2/5 stars
LetMeEntertainYou	3/5 stars

Ladylike received generally mixed reviews. Pooltrax found that the album "increasingly leans towards electro, but the lyrics and voices of the three Monrose singers still clearly recall pop [...] However, the girls still excel at the calm ballads. The soothing sounds do the otherwise very loud album a lot of good and showcase the voices much better than the fast-paced up-tempo numbers." LetMeEntertainYou noted that the songs on the Ladylikewere much "more mature" and "more melodic" than the songs on previous album I Am. laut.de editor Eberhard Dobler rated the album two out of five stars and wrote: "Eurodance-pop, R&B/pop blueprints, one or two electro breakaways – that's how the three Monrose girls shake through their fourth studio album." He found that "the bottom line is that the sound is pretty much out of tune ("This Is Me"). It's all about a production that has to satisfy minimum sales claims. A chic styling, a Sexiest Woman of the World past and casting-tested voices: The qualification is done. Musically, however, Monrose will not survive the group stage."

Similarly, Albert Ranner von CDstarts.de felt that "contrary to the unpleasantly sterile look of the cover and the video [for "Like a Lady"], the fourth Monrose is only half as bad as it was feared. Mandy, Senna and Bahar (or their songwriters) remember their strengths for six songs. Nevertheless, Ladylike still lacks any own identity on the musical side that Monrose will probably be denied until old age [...] Compared to its predecessors, this time, however, this fact is less disturbing and the Popstars winners surprisingly fall into midfield." In her review for Weser-Kurier, journalist Kati Hofacker found that "one thing the trio – or rather their crew of producer – can for sure: They manage to knock out one hit grenade after the other with the simplest of ingredients, the most flimsy set pieces and the stupidest lyrics [...] But yes, this thing will be a hit."

== Chart performance ==
Released on 11 June 2010 in most parts of German-speaking Europe, Ladylike debuted and peaked at number ten on the German Albums Chart in the week of 25 June 2010, becoming the band's fourth consecutive top ten album. It would remain 13 weeks on the chart. In Austria and Switzerland, Ladylike reached number 26 and number 25 on the albums charts, respectively. It marked Monrose's first album to miss the top 20 on both charts. By November 2010, the album had sold 30,000 units worldwide.

== Track listing ==
Ladylike track listing
No.	Title	Writer(s)	Producer(s)	Length
1.	"This Is Me"	Mich Hansen; Jonas Jeberg; Paul Michael Berry; Shaznay Lewis	Pete Kirtley; Christian "TheFatRat" Buettner; Marcello "Cello" Pagin	3:42
2.	"Superstar DJ"	Pagin; Buettner; Alistair Tennant	Pagin; Buettner	3:36
3.	"Like a Lady"	Alexander Komlew; Zippy Davis; Risto Asikainen; Ercola	Zip & Alex; Ercola	3:11
4.	"Don't Take It Personal"	Pagin; Buettner; Fiora Cutler	Pagin; Buettner	3:23
5.	"Doing Fine"	Obi Mhondera; Tim Hawes; Paul Berry; Will Simms	Hawes; Mhondera; Simms	3:30
6.	"Definition of a Woman"	Paulini Curuenavuli; Barry Southgate; Michael Szumowski	Alex Geringas; Bülent Aris	3:40
7.	"Love Must Carry On"	Marcus Brosch; Tobias Neumann; Mark Tremaine Agbi; Inessa Alexandrova	Brosch; Neumann	3:22
8.	"Breathe You In"	Thanh Bui; Gary Pinto; Rodney Mark Davies	Kirtley; Andrew Murray; Christian Ballard	4:08
9.	"All or Nothing"	Billy Burnette; Valeria Andrews	Kirtley; Murray; Ballard	3:54
10.	"No No No"	Raphael Schillebeeckx; Sanne Putseys	Geringas; Aris	3:38
11.	"Catwalk V-O-G-U-E"	Tobias Gad; Joy Lynn Strand	Kirtley; Murray; Ballard	2:48
12.	"Mono"	Geringas; Elias Kapari; Charlie Mason; Bernd Klimpel	Kapari; Geringas	3:20
13.	"I Surrender" (hidden track)	Kit Hain; Udo Mechels; Yannic Fonderie	Kirtley; Murray; Ballard	4:06
Total length:				47:38

== Charts ==
Chart performance for Ladylike
Chart (2010)	Peak position
Austrian Albums (Ö3 Austria)	26
German Albums (Offizielle Top 100)	10
Swiss Albums (Schweizer Hitparade)	25

== Release history ==
Ladylike release history
Region	Date	Format	Label	Ref(s)
Various	11 June 2010	CD; digital download	Starwatch; Cheyenne; Warner	
