= What You Don't Know (Monrose song) =

Single by Monrose

from the album Strictly Physical
- Released: 7 December 2007
- Studio: Weryton Studios (Munich)
- Length: 3:45
- Label: Starwatch
- Songwriter(s): Mattias Lindblom; Billy Mann; Anders Wollbeck
- Producer(s): Christian Ballard; Tim Hawes; Pete Kirtley; Obi Mhondera; Andrew Murray

Monrose singles chronology
"Strictly Physical" (2007)	"What You Don't Know" (2007)	"Strike the Match" (2008)

"What You Don't Know" is a song by all-female German pop band Monrose. It was written by American songwriter Billy Mann along with Swedish musicians Mattias Lindblom and Anders Wollbeck and recorded for the band's second studio album, Strictly Physical (2007). Production on the track was helmed by Christian Ballard, Tim Hawes, Pete Kirtley, Obi Mhondera, and Andrew Murray from British production teams Jiant and Snowflake. A guitar-led pop ballad was released as

The song earned largely positive reviews from music critics who ranked it among Strictly Physical's standout tracks. "What You Don't Know" was released by Starwatch as the album's third and final single on 7 December 2007. It became the band's fifth consecutive top ten hit, reaching number six on the German Singles Chart, and entered the top 20 in Austria. An accompanying music video, directed by Markus Gerwinat, was filmed in Hamburg and released in November 2007.

== Background ==
"What You Don't Know" was written by Swedish songwriters Mattias Lindblom and Anders Wollbeck along with American musician Billy Mann, while production was overseen by frequent Monrose contributors Christian Ballard, Tim Hawes, Pete Kirtley, Obi Mhondera, and Andrew Murray for British production teams Jiant and Snowflake.

== Critical reception ==
"What You Don't Know" earned largely positive reviews. Julia Dörfler from laut.de wrote that the song "turns out to be a ballad in which the three stars can shine with their voices. The pure acoustic instrumentation makes the melancholic track stand out from the rest of the album." Kronen Zeitung found that with the song "Monrose show the other side of their hit album Strictly Physical for the first time. The soulful heart-pain ballad lives only through the singing skills of the three girls." Letmeentertainyou.de felt that the ballad suffered from its "cold plastic production."

== Music video ==
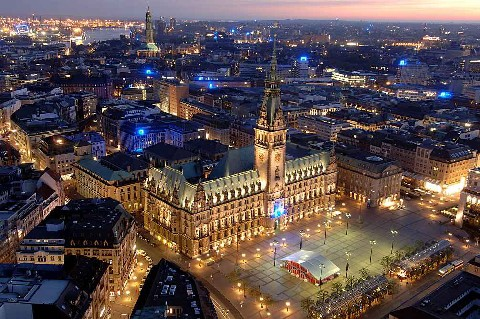
A music video for "What You Don't Know" was filmed in Hamburg in November 2007.

A music video for "What You Don't Know," directed by Markus Gerwinat and produced by Q-Filmproduktion, was shot on 13 November 2007 in Hamburg, Germany, and world premiered on November 23 on German music network VIVA's show Viva Live!. Actress Toula Savvidou plays one of the characters in the visuals.

At the beginning of the video, a woman (Savvidou) leaves her bed while her male partner looks on. She seemingly ignores him. The three women of Monrose are then seen over an intersection standing and singing between shots. Bahar Kizil is seen throughout the video along with her reflection, walking streets, while Senna Gammour is seen in the backseat of a car. Mandy Capristo is shown alone. The woman of the story lives her life while the man follows, and she continues in not noticing him. By the end of the video, it is revealed that he is dead, and was killed in an automobile accident. She loved him then and still. His body fades as he learns the truth, and the video comes to a close.

== Track listings ==
CD single
No.	Title	Writer(s)	Producer(s)	Length
1.	"What You Don't Know" (album version)	Anders Wollbeck; Mattias Lindblom; Billy Mann	Jiant; Snowflake	3:45
2.	"What You Don't Know" (Candlelight Mix)	Wollbeck; Lindblom; Mann	Jiant; Snowflake; The Snowflakers^{[a]}	3:49
3.	"Say Yes"	Robin Jenssen; Nermin Harambasic; Anne Judith Wik; Ronny Svendsen; Hallgeir Rustan	Remee; Thomas Troelsen	3:54
4.	"What You Don't Know" (instrumental)	Anders Wollbeck; Mattias Lindblom; Billy Mann	Jiant; Snowflake	3:45

Notes

- ^{^[a]} denotes remix producer(s)

== Credits and personnel ==
Credits adapted from the liner notes of Strictly Physical.

- Christian Ballard – drums, percussion, producer
- Dan Frampton – mixing
- Tim Hawes – guitars, producer
- Pete Kirtley – bass, producer
- Mattias Lindblom – writer
- Andreas Lunch – vocal editing
- Billy Mann – writer
- Obi Mhondera – producer
- Andrew Murray – keyboards, producer
- Anders Wollbeck – writer
- Claus Üblacker – engineering
- Haniff Williams – vocal editing

== Charts ==
=== Weekly charts ===
Weekly chart performance for "What You Don't Know"
Chart (2007)	Peak position
Austria (Ö3 Austria Top 40)	16
European Hot 100 Singles (Billboard)	23
Germany (GfK)	6
Switzerland (Schweizer Hitparade)	34

=== Year-end charts ===
Year-end chart performance for "What You Don't Know"
Chart (2008)	Rank
Germany (Official German Charts)	50
