= I Am (Monrose album) =

Studio album by Monrose
- Released: 26 September 2008
- Length: 50:13
- Label: Starwatch; Cheyenne; Warner
- Producer: Carl Björsell; Guy Chambers; Cutfather; Oscar Görres; Nermin Harambasic; JoelJoel; Pete Kirtley; Jonas Jeberg; Jiant; Roman Preylowski; Emanuel Rehwald; Snowflakers; Ronny Svendsen; Ryan Tedder; Didrik Thott

Monrose chronology
Strictly Physical (2007)	I Am (2008)	Ladylike (2010)

Singles from I Am
- 1. "Strike the Match" Released: 6 June 2008; 2. "Hit'n'Run" Released: 3 October 2008; 3. "Why Not Us" Released: 28 November 2008

I Am is the third studio album by German pop trio Monrose. It was first released by Starwatch Music, Cheyenne Records and Warner Music on 26 September 2008 in German-speaking Europe. The band reunited with frequent contributors Jiant and Snowflakers and Danish producer Jonas Jeberg to work on the bulk of the album, though several new collaborators were consulted to hand in music, including Ronny Svendsen and Nermin Harambasic from Norwegian music collective Dsign Music, Oscar Gorres, Didrik Thott, Carl Björsell, JoelJoel, Guy Chambers, and OneRepublic frontman Ryan Tedder.

Taking Monrose's work further into dance and electro music, the album scored a generally negative reception from music critics, with critics highlighting its lack of cohesion, uninspired production, and failure to meet the expectations set by its predecessor, although some noted the album’s fresh sound and well-executed ballads. Upon its release, I Am debuted at number nine on the German Albums Chart and reached top twenty in Austria and Switzerland. It spawned three singles, including Tedder-penned up tempo song "Strike the Match," a top ten hit in Germany, as well as "Hit'n'Run" and "Why Not Us", both of which missed the top ten.

== Production and songs ==
The songs on I Am were selected out of more than six hundred demo tracks. The album's opening track, "Strike the Match", was penned by OneRepublic singer Ryan Tedder and Deborah Epstein. Selected out of several tracks in Tedder's repertoire, it was the first song confirmed to be appearing on the album. Released as its leading single, the song reached the top ten of the German Singles Chart. Second track "A Love Bizarre" is a cover version of the 1985 single by Sheila E. and Prince. Using the original instrumental as produced by Prince, the song has been described as all-time favorite by band member Guemmour. "Certified" was written by longtime contributors Edwin "Lil' Eddie" Serrano and Jonas Jeberg, and has been described as "high-pitched, technical, and scratching."

"Why Not Us" by Guy Chambers has been categorized as an "emotional mid-tempo ballad [...] for the wintertime." Originally planned to be released as the album's second single, it was released as the third. In addition, the song served as a promotional track for the We Love Otto mail order campaign. "Stolen" features background vocals by Jamie Pineda from the successful pop music project Sweetbox after Jamie had recorded the song first. Fifth track "Going Out Tonight" incorporates elements of ragga and dancehall music, including rapped verses by all three band members, while "You Can Look" combines dance-pop with rock music. "Teach Me How to Jump" deals with death. The song was recorded in dedication to lost ones, including Guemmour's father, who died in 1992.

== Critical reception ==
Professional ratings
Review scores
Source	Rating
CDStarts	3/10
laut.de	1/5 stars
LetMeEntertainYou	1/5 stars

I Am received mainly negative reviews. Christian Bartz from Beatblogger wrote that the album "falls short of the high expectations set by its impressive predecessor, Strictly Physical. The hit density is noticeably lower than on the second album, and some filler tracks are hard to avoid. On the plus side, the sound is fresh and often ventures into experimental territory, with production that consistently feels international. A few more memorable melodies wouldn’t have hurt, and at times, the otherwise strong vocals of the Monrose girls fade too far into the background." Saarbrücker Zeitung editor Christina Korb called the album a "mix of high-energy club dance tracks, '80s-inspired dance tunes, and soulful mid-tempo numbers [...] Even if some tracks might not be to everyone’s taste, there’s something here for a wide range of audiences. The ballads, however, are particularly well done."

laut.de critic Artur Schulz described I Am as an "album with less substance than a bag of trail mix. A patchwork of hastily thrown-together, lightweight tunes—stitched together with a hot needle. By now, these three girls reveal themselves as the Sugababes for bargain-bin shoppers. Better Mon Chérie than Monrose — it's just more tasteful." Albert Ranner from CDStarts dismissed the "formulaic, uninspired blend of pop songs" on I Am, calling it a "total sham: heavy beats and female vocals, flawlessly produced, but utterly soulless and interchangeable." He found that "unfortunately, the producers squander the potential here, as their constant eye on the charts gets in the way—preventing the kind of relaxed and unrestrained songwriting that, [...] it deplored their attempt to go more into electropop as doing them no favors, and suggested that it could lead to a downfall from their established position in the German music scene." LetMeEntertainYou found that the album "belongs in the digital dumpster" and concluded: "Two decent little pop songs out of fifteen is a pretty poor return — and makes I Am the weakest Monrose album to date."

== Chart performance ==
I Am debuted and peaked at number 9 on the German Albums Chart on 10 October 2008. It marked the band's third consecutive top ten entry and remained 14 weeks on the chart. In Switzerland, I Am debuted at number 14 on the Swiss Hitparade. It spent another four weeks on the chart. In Austria, the album became the band's first album to miss the top 10 of the Ö3 Austria Albums Chart. It peaked at number 20.

== Track listing ==
I Am track listing
No.	Title	Writer(s)	Producer(s)	Length
1.	"Strike the Match"	Ryan Tedder; Deborah Epstein	Tedder; Andrew Murray^{[A]}; Christian Ballard^{[A]}	2:56
2.	"A Love Bizarre"	Sheila Escovedo; Prince Rogers Nelson	Jiant; Snowflakers	3:47
3.	"Certified"	Edwin Serrano; Eritza Laues	Jonas Jeberg; Cutfather	3:06
4.	"Why Not Us"	Guy Chambers; Alexis Strum	Chambers; Pete Kirtley^{[B]}	3:29
5.	"Going Out Tonight"	Kirtley; Obi Mhondera	Jiant	2:50
6.	"You Can Look"	Nermin Harambasic; Anne Judith Wik; Ronny Svendsen; Robin Jenssen	Ronny Svendsen; Nermin Harambasic	3:25
7.	"Tip Toe"	Costandia Costi; Carl Ryden; Hugo Lira; Ian-Paolo Lira; Thomas Gustafsson	Jiant	2:59
8.	"Teach Me How to Jump"	David Eriksen; Virginia McGrail	Jiant; Snowflaker	3:31
9.	"Stolen"	Carl Björsell; Edward Steve Louis; Didrik Thott	Björsell; Thott	3:19
10.	"Electricity"	Daniel Volpe; Thomas Lipp	Roman Preylowski; Emanuel Rehwald; Jiant	2:56
11.	"Hit'n'Run"	JoelJoel; The Provider; Charlie Mason	JoelJoel; Oscar Görres	3:14
12.	"No Never"	Rob Divas; Shelly Poole	Jiant; Snowflakers	3:45
13.	"Stained"	Andreas Romdhane; Josef Larossi; Linda Király; Savan Kotecha	Jiant; Snowflakers	3:37
14.	"What They Want"	Alex Cartañá; Pete Martin; Jasmine Baird	Jiant; Snowflakers	3:53
15.	"Don't Touch the Fader"	Karen Poole; Mathias Wollo; Jonas Quant	Jiant; Snowflakers	3:17

iTunes bonus track
No.	Title	Writer(s)	Producer(s)	Length
16.	"Step Aside"	Serrano; Eritza Laues	Jeberg; Cutfather	3:07

Notes

- ^{^[A]} denotes additional producer
- ^{^[B]} denotes co-producer

Sample credits

- "A Love Bizarre" is a cover version of the same-titled 1985 song performed by American singer Sheila E.

== Charts ==
Weekly chart performance
Chart (2008)	Peak position
Austrian Albums (Ö3 Austria)	20
European Top 100 Albums (Billboard)	35
German Albums (Offizielle Top 100)	9
Swiss Albums (Schweizer Hitparade)	14

== Release history ==
I Am release history
Region	Date	Edition	Format	Label
Austria	26 September 2008	Standard	CD; digital download	Starwatch; Cheyenne; Warner
Germany	26 September 2008	Standard	CD; digital download	Starwatch; Cheyenne; Warner
Switzerland	26 September 2008	Standard	CD; digital download	Starwatch; Cheyenne; Warner
