= Like a Lady (Monrose song) =

Single by Monrose

from the album Ladylike
- Released: 28 May 2010
- Length: 3:09
- Label: Starwatch; Cheyenne; Warner
- Songwriters: Risto Asikainen; Zippy Davis; Veikka Ercola; Alexander Komlew
- Producer: Tuneverse

Monrose singles chronology
"Why Not Us" (2008)	"Like a Lady" (2010)	"This Is Me" (2010)

"Like a Lady" is a song performed by German girl band Monrose. It was written by Risto Asikainen, Zippy Davis, Veikka "DJ Ercola" Erkola and Alexander Komlew and recorded for their fourth studio album Ladylike (2010), with production helmed by Davis, Erkola and Komlew under their production moniker Tuneverse. "Like Lady" is an uptempo dance pop song with elements of electropop, synth pop, and contemporary R&B and has lyrics which speak about a woman calling her love interest to recognize her worth.

The band's ninth single overall, the song was selected as the album's leading single and proved to be commercially successful upon its release in May 2010, reaching the top ten on the Austrian and German Singles Charts. An accompanying music video, directed by Thomas Job, was filmed in Berlin, Germany in May 2010. Well-received, it was nominated for an Echo Award for Best Video (National) in 2011. "Like Lady" was promoted through numerous live appearances, including a high-profile performance on German television show The Dome. Monrose premiered the song on the final episode of the fifth cycle of Germany's Next Topmodel on 10 June 2010.

== Background ==
"Like a Lady" was written by Risto Asikainen, Zippy Davis, Veikka "DJ Ercola" Erkola and Alexander Komlew and recorded for their fourth studio album Ladylike (2010). Production was overseen by Davis, Erkola and Komlew under their production moniker Tuneverse. On their decision to release the song as the lead single from Ladylike, band member Mandy Capristo elaborated that "Like a Lady" was "just perfect as the first single. The [song] is an absolutely catchy tune and goes straight to the legs."

== Music video ==
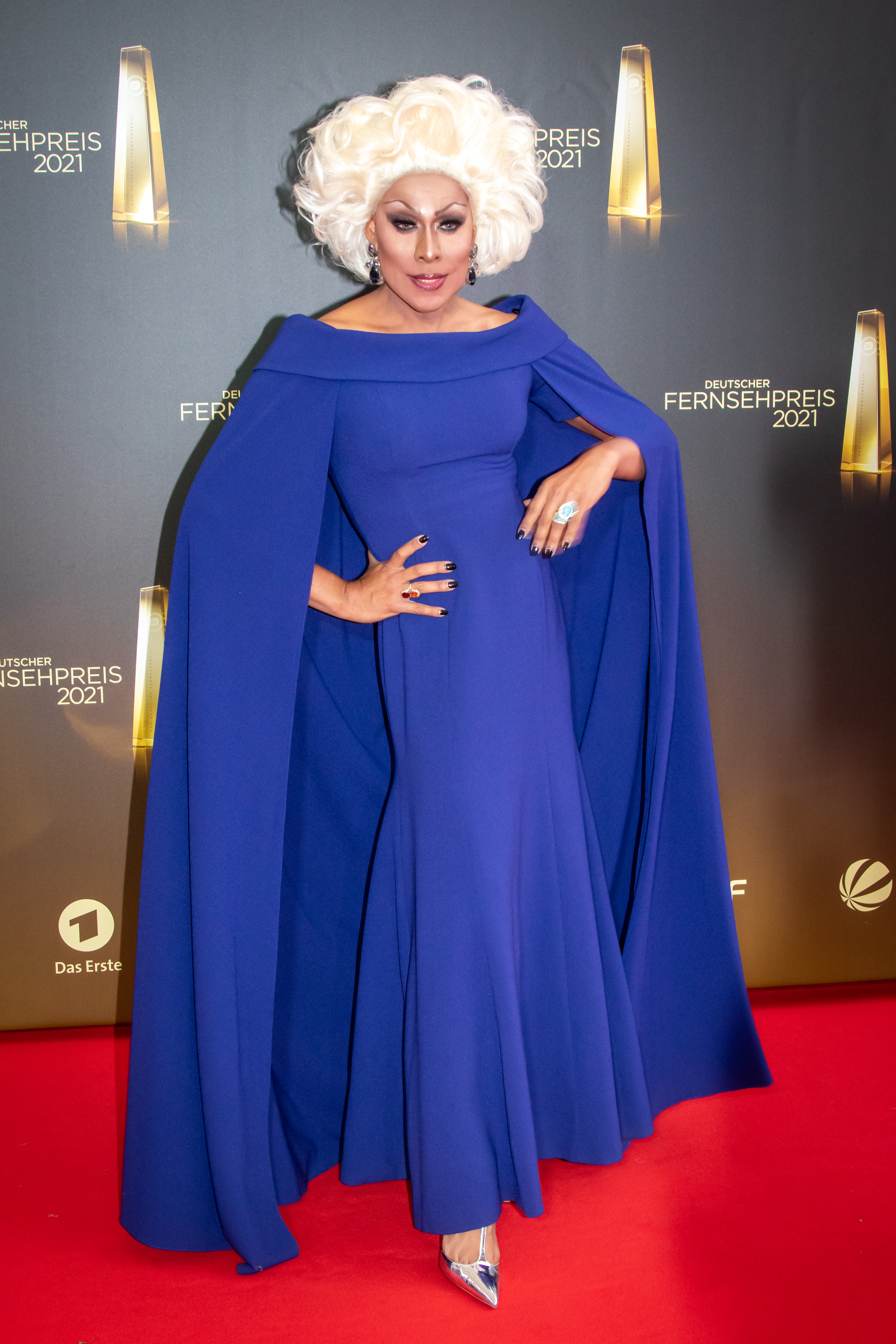
Drag queen Catherrine Leclery appears in the music video.

The accompanying music video for "Like a Lady" was directed by Thomas Job and filmed in the week of 3 May 2010 in Berlin. Production was helmed by productions companies Now & Partners and Bobby Doog Productions, while editing was overseen by Cornelis Harder with assistance from Sabrina Schmittmann. Marvin Smith served as the video's choreographer. Drag queens Olivia O'Hara, Catherrine Leclery und Nani Labelle make appearances. The video made its debut on 11 May 2010 on the band's official MySpace page and had its official television debut one day later on German music network VIVA's show VIVA Live!.

The video has three main sequences with each sequence featuring a different costume. The first sequences shows the members of the band sitting in little tubes, performing in black costumes with high heels and shoulder pads made of mirrors. There are also three dancers and also four drag queens who are performing with the girls in some dance-scenes. In the next sequence, the group is dressed in white outfits with big white shoulder pads. In this sequence, they are also dancing with the dancers but with white fluorescent tubes, too. In the last part, the girls are dancing dancing routines behind a curtain. In this scene, they are wearing black leather outfits with silver rivets.

== Cover versions ==
- On 24 September 2010, trance and house music producer The Real Booty Babes released eight versions of the song.

== Track listings ==
CD single (2-track)
No.	Title	Writer(s)	Producer(s)	Length
1.	"Like a Lady"	Alexander Komlew; Zippy Davis; Risto Asikainen; Ercola	Zip & Alex; Ercola	3:09
2.	"I Surrender"	Kit Hain; Udo Mechels; Yannic Fonderie	Pete Kirtley; Andrew Murray; Christian Ballard	4:06

Digital single
No.	Title	Writer(s)	Producer(s)	Length
1.	"Like a Lady" (Louis Carpaccio Remix)	Komlew; Davis; Asikainen; Ercola	Zip & Alex; Ercola; Louis Carpaccio^{[A]}	5:00

Notes

- ^{^[A]} denotes additional producer

== Credits and personnel ==
Credits adapted from the liner notes of Ladylike.

- Risto Asikainen – writing
- Mandy Capristo – vocals
- Zippy Davis – production, writing
- Veikka "DJ Ercola" Erkola – production, writing
- Senna Gammour – vocals
- Bahar Kızıl – vocals
- Alexander Komlew – production, writing

== Charts ==
=== Weekly charts ===
Weekly chart performance for "Like a Lady"
Chart (2010)	Peak position
Austria (Ö3 Austria Top 40)	9
Germany (GfK)	9
Switzerland (Schweizer Hitparade)	13

=== Year-end charts ===
Year-end chart performance for "Like a Lady"
Chart (2010)	Position
Germany (Official German Charts)	77

== Release history ==
"Like a Lady" release history
Region	Date	Format(s)	Label	Ref(s)
Austria	28 May 2010	CD single; download	Starwatch; Cheyenne; Warner	
Germany	28 May 2010	CD single; download	Starwatch; Cheyenne; Warner	
Switzerland	28 May 2010	CD single; download	Starwatch; Cheyenne; Warner	
