= Strictly Physical (album) =

Studio album by Monrose
- Released: 21 September 2007
- Length: 47:24
- Labels: Starwatch; Cheyenne; Warner
- Producers: Peter Biker; Jiant; Pete "Boxsta" Martin; Remee; Snowflakers; Thomas Troelsen

Monrose chronology
Temptation (2006)	Strictly Physical (2007)	I Am (2008)

Singles from Strictly Physical
- 1. "Hot Summer" Released: 29 June 2007; 2. "Strictly Physical" Released: 14 September 2007; 3. "What You Don't Know" Released: 7 December 2007

Strictly Physical is the second studio album by all-female German pop trio Monrose. It was released by Starwatch Music in association with Cheyenne Records and Warner Music on 21 September 2007 in German-speaking Europe and on 8 October 2007 in parts of Eastern Europe. Arriving just nine months after their best-selling debut Temptation (2006), the album took Monrose's work further into dance and electro music, featuring main production by Danish producers Remee, Thomas Troelsen, and Peter Biker, alongside contributions from British teams such as Jiant and Snowflakers.

The album received mixed reviews from critics, who acknowledged its improved production quality and more experimental blend of electro, R&B, and pop, while praising its danceable tracks and commercial appeal, though several reviewers criticized its reliance on familiar trends and its lack of originality and distinct artistic identity. Commercially, although it fell short of the major sales achieved by Temptation, the album was still a strong success, debuting at number two on the German Albums Chart, reaching the top ten in Austria and Switzerland, and earning Gold certification in both Germany and Austria.

The album produced three singles, including the lead release "Hot Summer," which became the band's second number-one hit in Austria, Germany, and Switzerland, as well as one of the year's best-selling songs, while also achieving success across Scandinavia, Eastern Europe, and the Benelux region. Its follow-ups, "Strictly Physical" and "What You Don't Know," further extended Monrose's run of German top ten hits to five, although the latter fell short of the top twenty in Switzerland.

== Background ==
In December 2006, Mandy Capristo, Senna Gammour, and Bahar Kizil emerged as the winners of Popstars – Neue Engel braucht das Land, the fifth season of the German reality television talent competition Popstars, subsequently forming the girl group Monrose. Their debut single, titled "Shame," achieved immediate commercial success, debuting at number one across German-speaking Europe. It became the fastest-selling CD single of 2006 and, following the establishment of the official legal digital download charts in Germany in 2004, was recognized as the most-downloaded track in the country's chart history at the time. Temptation, the band's debut album, was released shortly thereafter and entered the album charts in Germany, Austria, and Switzerland at number one. The album received platinum certification from the International Federation of the Phonographic Industry (IFPI) for exceeding 200,000 units sold within its first two weeks of release. Domestically, Temptation went on to sell over 600,000 copies, solidifying Monrose’s status as a prominent act in the German pop music scene.

In early 2007, the trio qualified for the German national pre-selection of the Eurovision Song Contest 2007, organized and broadcast by the ARD, with their second single "Even Heaven Cries". Although they were considered early favourites by the media, the band eventually finished second. Following this, the band announced their Venus Temptation Tour with twenty dates, beginning at the Hanover Capitol on 29 April 2007. Sponsored by Global Gillette, Monrose's debut concert tour was launched in support of their early commercial success. Despite the group's popularity and extensive media promotion, the tour was met with underwhelming public response. Intense media scrutiny followed as the tour struggled to attract large audiences; no concert on the schedule achieved a sold-out status. As a result of persistently low ticket sales, four scheduled performances were ultimately cancelled..

== Promotion ==
The album spawned three singles. Lead single "Hot Summer" became the band's second number-one hit in Austria, Germany and Switzerland and one of the biggest-selling songs of the year on German online music stores, also obtaining success in Scandinavia, Eastern Europe and the Benelux states. Its follow-up single "Strictly Physical" became Monrose's first top 10 entry on the Polish Top 50 since their debut release "Shame" (2006), while the ballad "What You Don't Know" became their fifth consecutive top 10 single in Germany, although it failed to reach the top 20 in Switzerland.

== Critical reception ==
Professional ratings
Review scores
Source	Rating
CDStarts	4.5/10
Energy Zürich	2/5 stars
laut.de	2/5 stars
LetMeEntertainYou	2/5 stars
Tiscali	2/5 stars

Strictly Physical received a generally mixed reception from music critics. MusikWoche observed that the album distinguishes itself from its predecessor through notable artistic development and production quality aligned with international standards. The magazine ranked "Hot Summer", "Strictly Physical" and "What You Don't Know" among the best tracks on the album. Energy Zürich described the album as "groovy, feel-good songs that are universally danceable, blending elements of R&B and pop" and further wrote: "Tracks guaranteed to set any dance floor on fire. In that sense, lyrical depth takes a backseat. Catchy melodies, light-hearted lyrics, and three attractive young women who know how to market themselves define the second album of these talent show stars."

Julia Dörfler from laut.de called the album a "more mature and individual" but generally "well-snitched" output in comparison with the band's debut album. She praised Strictly Physical for its experimental production towards electro and contemporary R&B music. CDStarts critic Albert Ranner remarked that "right from the opener "Dangerous," an electro-house beat pulses through the speakers, setting the tone for an album largely driven by thumping dance rhythms. Aside from the obligatory ballads, the remaining tracks wrap themselves in club-ready beats—some distancing themselves entirely from R&B, while others maintain varying degrees of connection to the genre. The result is a collection of appealing, if mostly average, pop songs." Jochen Overbeck from Monsters & Critics concluded: "It fulfills all expectations and will likely perform well commercially, but it fails to establish any real artistic depth," while LetMeEntertainYou deemed the album "strictly unnecessary" and added: "Unfortunately, a distinct style for the girls is still missing; as before, the sound is copied from currently trending US stars [...] Even in terms of vocals, the Monrose girls are unable to stand out."

== Commercial performance ==
While Strictly Physical did not replicate the commercial heights of Temptation, it nonetheless represented another significant success for Monrose. Demonstrating continued public interest and solid sales figures, it opened at number two on the German Albums Chart in the week of 5 October 2007 – second only to English singer James Blunt's All the Lost Souls (2007). Shipping more than 90.000 copies in its first week of release, this marked the highest chart position for a sophomore album by any band formed through the Popstars franchise, with the sole exception of No Angels' 2002 number-one studio album Now... Us!. Later that same year, Strictly Physical was certified Gold by the Bundesverband Musikindustrie (BVMI) in recognition of shipment figures exceeding 100,000 units. The album also reached the top ten in Austria and Switzerland, peaking at number seven on the Austrian Albums Chart and number six on the Swiss Albums Chart. On 12 December 2017, it reached Gold status in Austria.

== Track listing ==
Strictly Physical – Standard edition
No.	Title	Writer(s)	Producer(s)	Length
1.	"Dangerous"	Remee; Thomas Troelsen	Remee; Troelsen	3:18
2.	"Hot Summer" (Radio Edit)	Remee; Troelsen	Remee; Troelsen	3:30
3.	"Strictly Physical" (Radio Edit)	Tim Hawes; Pete Kirtley; Andrew Murray; Christian Ballard; Obi Mhondera	Jiant; Snowflake	3:40
4.	"Rebound"	Pete "Boxta" Martin; Tina Harris; Stephen Lee	Jiant; Martin	3:39
5.	"What You Don't Know"	Anders Wollbeck; Mattias Lindblom; Billy Mann	Jiant; Snowflake	3:45
6.	"Leading Me on"	Robin Jenssen; Nermin Harambasic; Anne Judith Wik; Ronny Svendsen; Pelle Lidell; Hallgeir Rustan	Jiant; Snowflake	4:00
7.	"Golden"	Kyösti Salokorpi; Grant Black	Remee; Troelsen	3:06
8.	"Sooner or Later"	Remee; Troelsen	Remee; Troelsen	2:45
9.	"Just like That"	Remee; Peter Biker; Tim Kellett; Robin Taylor-Firth	Remee; Biker	4:19
10.	"Yesterday's Gone"	Hawes; Kirtley; Murray; Ballard	Jiant; Snowflake	3:26
11.	"Burning"	Remee; Troelsen	Remee; Troelsen	4:06
12.	"Monrose Theme"	Remee; Troelsen; Senna Gammour; Bahar Kizil; Mandy Capristo	Remee; Troelsen	3:46
13.	"Everybody Makes Mistakes"	Deborah French; Murray; Ballard; Black	Jiant; Snowflake	3:55
Total length:				47:24

Special edition / Musicload bonus track
No.	Title	Writer(s)	Producer(s)	Length
14.	"Say Yes"	Jenssen; Harambasic; Wik; Svendsen; Rustan	Remee	3:53

International bonus tracks
No.	Title	Writer(s)	Producer(s)	Length
14.	"Shame"	Hawes; Kirtley; Ballard; Murray	Jiant; Snowflake	3:29
15.	"Even Heaven Cries" (Single Version 2007)	Robbie Nevil; Philip Denker; Lauren Evans; Jonas Jeberg; Jens Lumholt	Jeberg; Thorsten Brötzmann^{[A]}	3:00

Notes

- ^{^[A]} denotes additional producer

Sample credits

- "Just like That" contains a sample of "You're Not Alone" (1996) as performed by Olive.

== Credits and personnel ==
Credits adapted from the liner notes of Strictly Physical.

Performers and musicians

- Christian Ballard – drums, percussion
- Deborah French – backing Vocals
- Tim Hawes – guitar
- Pete Kirtley – bass
- Andrew Murray – keyboards
- Thomas Troelsen – keyboards

Technical

- Christian Ballard – vocal assistance
- Peter Biker – producer
- Andreas Hviid – mixing
- Jiant – mixing, producer
- Andrew Lunch – engineer
- Peter Mark – mixing
- Pete "Boxsta" Martin – producer
- Andrew Murray – vocal assistance
- Mad Nilsson – mixing
- Remee – producer, vocal assistance
- Snowflakes – mixing, producer
- Claus Üblacker – engineer
- Hanif Wiliams – engineer
- Thomas Troelsen – producer, programming

== Charts ==
=== Weekly charts ===
Weekly chart performance for Strictly Physical
Chart (2007)	Peak position
Austrian Albums (Ö3 Austria)	7
European Albums (Billboard)	11
German Albums (Offizielle Top 100)	2
Swiss Albums (Schweizer Hitparade)	6

=== Monthly charts ===
Monthly chart performance for Strictly Physical
Chart (2007)	Position
Polish Albums (ZPAV)	55

== Certifications ==
Certifications for Strictly Physical
Region	Certification	Certified units/sales
Austria (IFPI Austria)	Gold	10,000^{*}
Germany (BVMI)	Gold	100,000^{^}
^{*} Sales figures based on certification alone.^{^} Shipments figures based on certification alone.

== Release history ==
Strictly Physical release history
Region	Date	Format	Label
Austria	21 September 2007	CD; Digital download	Starwatch; Warner
Germany	21 September 2007	CD; Digital download	Starwatch; Warner
Switzerland	21 September 2007	CD; Digital download	Starwatch; Warner
Poland	8 October 2007	CD; Digital download	Starwatch; Warner

== Cover versions ==
Spanish singer Soraya Arnelas covered the song "Rebound" on her 4th album Sin Miedo. Korean boyband Super Junior covered "Just Like That" for their third studio album Sorry, Sorry.
