= Strictly Physical (song) =

Single by Monrose

from the album Strictly Physical
- Released: September 14, 2007
- Studio: Weryton Studios (Munich)
- Length: 3:41
- Label: Starwatch; Warner
- Songwriter(s): Christian Ballard; Tim Hawes; Pete Kirtley; Obi Mhondera; Andrew Murray
- Producer(s): Christian Ballard; Tim Hawes; Pete Kirtley; Obi Mhondera; Andrew Murray

Monrose singles chronology
"Hot Summer" (2007)	"Strictly Physical" (2007)	"What You Don't Know" (2007)

"Strictly Physical" is a song by German pop girl group Monrose. It was written by British musicians Tim Hawes, Pete Kirtley, Obi Mhondera, Christian Ballard, and Andrew Murray and recorded by the trio for their same-titled second studio album (2007). Production was helmed by Mhondera along with duo Hawes and Kirtley as well as duo Ballard and Murray under their production monikers Jiant and Snowflakers. A dark and spooky, synthesizer–driven contemporary R&B record, it contains lyrics that reference to a celebration of sexual lust and conquest, leading up to a desire to get physical with a love interest.

The song was selected as the second single from its parent album and released one week ahead of Strictly Physical in September 2007. It earned generally positive reviews from critics who compared it favorably to Canadian singer Nelly Furtado's song "Say It Right" (2006). Commercially, "Strictly Physical" peaked at number six on the German Singles Chart, becoming the band's fourth consecutive single to do so, and reached the top twenty and thirty in Austria and Switzerland, respectively. For the accompanying music video which depicts the band during a photo shooting and in a boxing hall, Monrose reteamed with "Shame" director Oliver Sommer.

== Background ==
"Strictly Physical" was written and produced by Tim Hawes and Pete Kirtley from British production team Jiant along with Christian Ballard and Andrew Murray from production duo Snowflakers and Zimbabwean songwriter Obi Mhondera. A thirty-seconds clip of "Strictly Physical" was previewed on 27 August 2007 on the band's official website, and by 3 September the full track had leaked to the Internet via radio.

== Chart performance ==
"Strictly Physical" was released by Starwatch Music on 14 September 2007 as the second single from Monrose's same-titled second studio album (2007). It debuted at number six on the German Singles Chart in the week of 28 September 2007, before falling to number seven and eventually once again peaking at number six in its third week. The band's fourth consecutive top ten hit, the song would spend eleven weeks inside the top 100 of the chart. GfK ranked it 65th on its 2007 year-end singles chart. Elsewhere, "Strictly Physical" became Monrose's fourth top 20 single in Austria and their fourth top 30 hit in Switzerland, peaking at number 16 and number 29, respectively.

== Music video ==
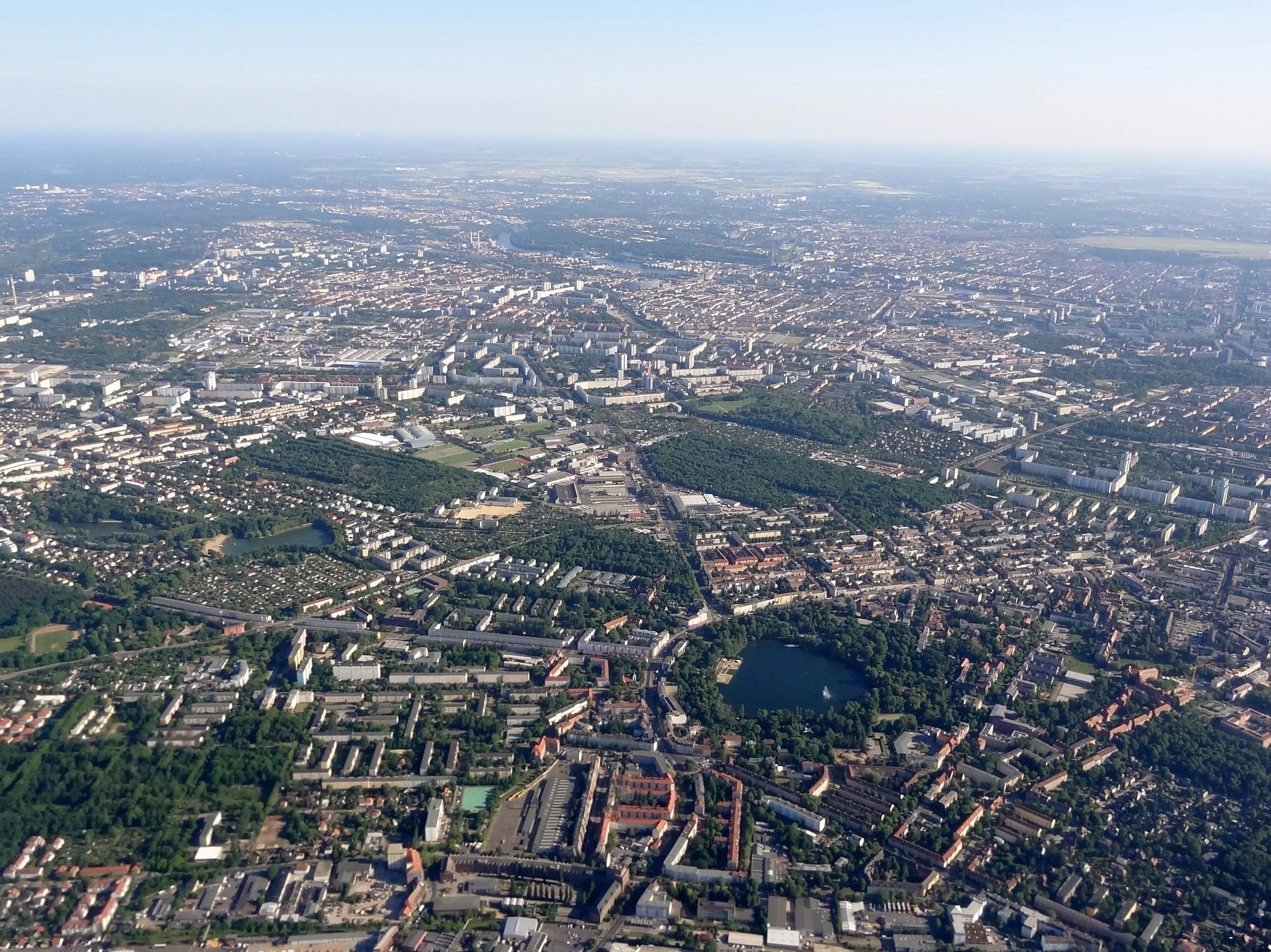
Filming took place in various locations, including Weissensee.

Monrose reunited with Oliver Sommer, director of the visuals for their debut single "Shame" (2006), to film a music video for "Strictly Physical." Shot between 27 and 29 August 2007, it was filmed in various locations throughout Berlin, including Boxtempel Berlin in the Weissensee borough. The video premiered on the band's official website on 12 September and made its television debut the following day on German music network VIVA's show VIVA Live.

At the beginning of the video, Bahar Kızıl, who is standing in front of a mirror, Senna Gammour, who is lying on a bed, and Mandy Capristo, who is sitting on a chair, are posing for a photographer in a photoshoot. They are dressed in light colored clothing, mostly white. The girls show discontent with the photos and storm out, leaving the photographer behind. In the following scenes they travel to what is presumably a boxing ring or gym. They are now shown dressed in male clothing. Monrose changes the roles, acting as three photographers with three men. Intercut with these plots are shots of the three women dressed in black and red latex outfits.

== Track listings ==
All tracks written by Christian Ballard, Tim Hawes, Pete Kirtley, Obi Mhondera, and Andrew Murray.

CD/digital single
No.	Title	Producer(s)	Length
1.	"Strictly Physical" (Radio Edit)	Jiant; Snowflake	3:41
2.	"Strictly Physical" (Beathoavenz Cut)	Jiant; Snowflake; Matzemillion^{[a]}; Beathoavenz^{[a]}	3:31
3.	"Strictly Physical" (sK fARhOt Remix)	Jiant; Snowflake; Farhad "Farhot" Samadzada^{[a]}	3:19
4.	"Strictly Physical" (Instrumental)	Jiant; Snowflake	3:41

Apple Music bonus track
No.	Title	Producer(s)	Length
5.	"Strictly Physical" (fARhOt Remix)	Jiant; Snowflake; Farhad "Farhot" Samadzada^{[a]}	4:05

2-Track Single
No.	Title	Producer(s)	Length
1.	"Strictly Physical" (Radio Edit)	Jiant; Snowflake	3:41
2.	"Strictly Physical" (Beathoavenz Cut)	Jiant; Snowflake; Matzemillion^{[a]}; Beathoavenz^{[a]}	3:28

Notes

- ^{^[a]} denotes remix producer(s)

== Credits and personnel ==
Credits adapted from the liner notes of Strictly Physical.

- Christian Ballard – choir, drums, keyboards, mixing, production, writing
- Mandy Capristo – vocals
- Dan Frampton – mixing
- Senna Gammour – vocals
- Tim Hawes – production, writing
- Pete Kirtley – bass, production, writing
- Bahar Kizil – vocals
- Obi Mhondera – production, writing
- Andrew Murray – choir, keyboards, production, writing
- Claus Üblacker – engineering

== Charts ==
=== Weekly charts ===
Weekly chart performance for "Strictly Physical"
Chart (2007)	Peak position
Austria (Ö3 Austria Top 40)	16
European Hot 100 Singles (Billboard)	26
Germany (GfK)	6
Switzerland (Schweizer Hitparade)	29

=== Year-end charts ===
Year-end chart performance for "Strictly Physical"
Chart (2007)	Rank
Germany (Official German Charts)	65

== Release history ==
Release dates and formats for "Strictly Physical"
Region	Date	Format	Label	Ref
Various	September 14, 2007	CD maxi single; digital download	Starwatch Music; Warner	
