= Why Not Us =

Single by Monrose

from the album I Am
- Released: 28 November 2008
- Length: 3:29
- Label: Starwatch
- Songwriters: Guy Chambers; Alexis Strum
- Producer: Guy Chambers

Monrose singles chronology
"Hit 'N' Run" (2008)	"Why Not Us" (2008)	"Like a Lady" (2010)

Music video
- "Why Not Us" on YouTube

"Why Not Us" is a song recorded by German pop trio Monrose. It was written by English songwriters Alexis Strum and Guy Chambers and produced by the latter along with frequent Monrose collaborator Pete Kirtley for the band's third studio album I Am (2008). A midtempo contemporary R&B-pop ballad with soft electro pop elements, "Why Not Us" is about a tumbling relationship which ultimately breaks up.

The song was released by Starwatch Music as the album's third and final single on 28 November 2008. It debuted and peaked at number 27 in Germany, becoming the group's lowest-charting single up to then, and failed to reach the upper half of the Austrian Singles Chart. An accompanying music video, directed by Markus Gerwinat, was filmed at the Orangery Palace in the Sanssouci Park of Potsdam.

== Background ==
"Why Not Us" was written by British songwriters Guy Chambers and Alexis Strum, and produced by the former, with frequent Monrose collaborator Pete Kirtley credited as a co-producer. Recorded by Mandy Capristo, Senna Gammour, and Bahar Kızıl for the band's third studio album I Am (2008), "Why Not Us" is a midtempo contemporary R&B-pop ballad that is about a tumbling relationship which ultimately breaks up. Band member Bahar Kizil called "Why Not Us" a "winter song." In 2025, Gammour and Kızıl disclosed that the band did not favor the song and had originally opposed its release as a single.

== Chart performance ==
"Why Not Us" was released by Starwatch Music as the album's third and final single on 28 November 2008. Initially selected by the label as the album's second single, Monrose reportedly disliked the idea of issuing the song as a single and only agreed to release it after Starwatch offered to release "Hit 'N' Run" as the album's second single beforehand. "Why Not Us" eventually debuted and peaked at number 27 on the German Singles Chart in the week of 12 December 2008, becoming Monrose's first single to miss the top 20. It also failed to reach the top 50 in Austria.

== Music video ==
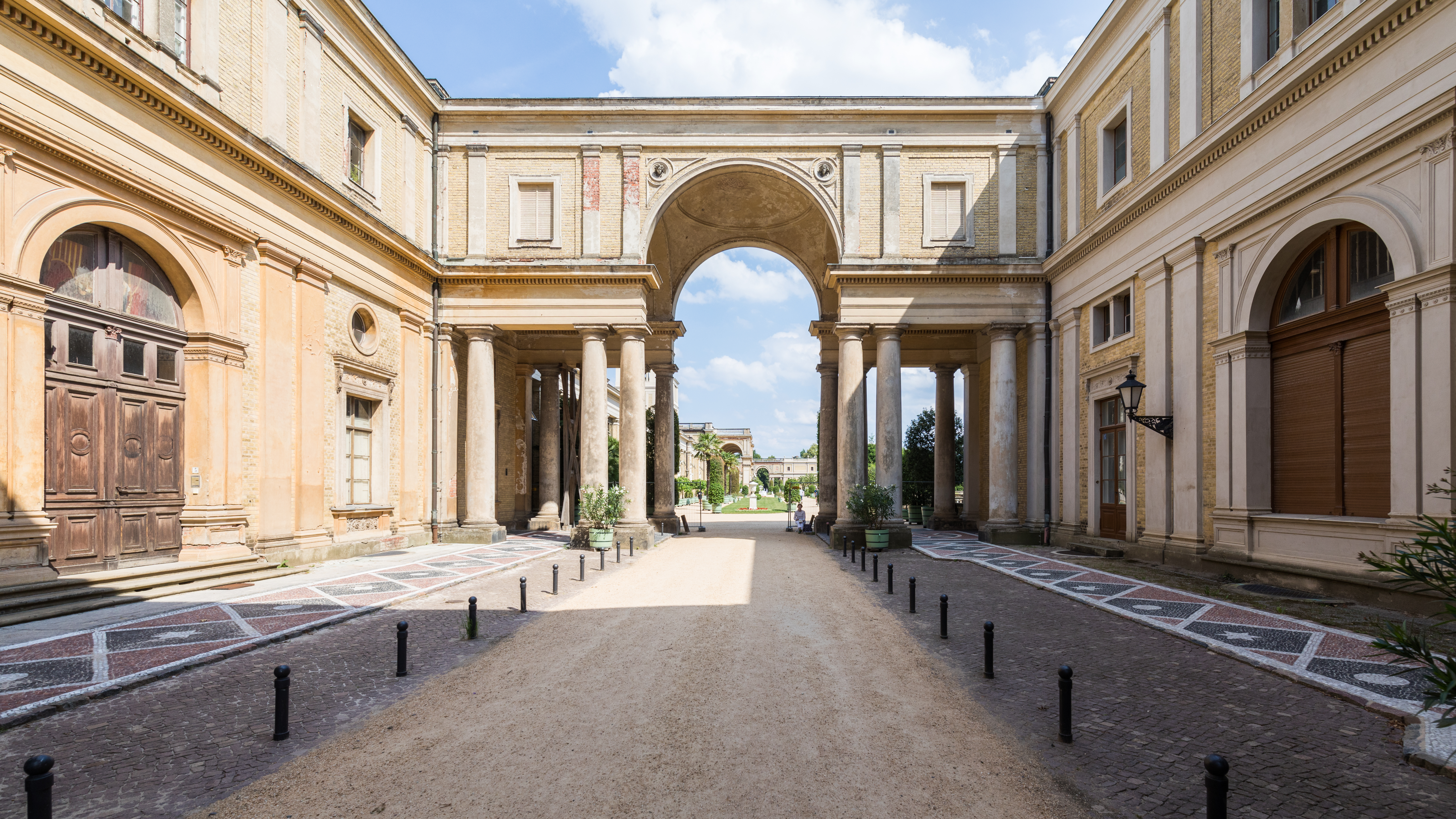
Orangery Palace in the Sanssouci Park of Potsdam served as a filming location for the video.

A music video for "Why Not Us" was directed by frequent Monrose collaborator Oliver Sommer and produced by AVA Studios. It was released online and through television channels on 14 November 2008. The visuals show the trio in black dresses in an autumn set, featuring visual elements from the Baroque age. Portions of the video were filmed at the Orangery Palace in the Sanssouci Park of Potsdam, with Westlicher Eckpavillion and Jubiläumsterrasse serving as main filming locations. Intercut are solo performances and group scenes that were filmed in front of a green screen and depict Capristo, Gammour, and Kızıl in various settings.

== Track listings ==
CD maxi-single
No.	Title	Writer(s)	Producer(s)	Length
1.	"Why Not Us"	Guy Chambers; Alexis Strum	Chambers; Pete Kirtley^{[a]}	3:29
2.	"Why Not Us" (Beathoavenz Cut)	Chambers; Strum	Chambers; Kirtley^{[a]}; Beathoavenz^{[b]}	3:34
3.	"Why Not Us" (Electrasonic RMX)	Chambers; Strum	Chambers; Kirtley^{[a]}; Sacha Collisson^{[b]}	3:15
4.	"Strike the Match" (fArHOt Remix)	Ryan Tedder; Deborah Epstein	Tedder; Andrew Murray^{[b]}; Christian Ballard^{[b]}	2:58

2-track CD single
No.	Title	Writer(s)	Producer(s)	Length
1.	"Why Not Us"	Chambers; Strum	Chambers; Kirtley^{[a]}	3:29
4.	"Strike the Match" (fArHOt Remix)	Tedder; Epstein	Tedder; Murray^{[b]}; Ballard^{[b]}	2:58

Notes

- ^{^[a]} denotes co-producer
- ^{^[b]} denotes additional producer

== Credits and personnel ==
Credits adapted from the liner notes of Strictly Physical.

- Keith Beauvais – keyboards
- Guy Chambers – instruments, producer, writer
- Mandy Capristo – vocals
- Senna Gammour – vocals
- Pete Kirtley – co-producer
- Bahar Kizil – vocals
- Paul Stanborough – engineer, original programming
- Seb Stone – backing vocals
- Alexis Strum – backing vocals, writer
- Ren Swan – recording engineer

== Charts ==
Chart performance for "Why Not Us"
Chart (2008)	Peak position
Austria (Ö3 Austria Top 40)	53
Germany (GfK)	27
