= Breathe You In =

Single by Monrose

from the album Ladylike
- Released: 3 December 2010
- Recorded: Berlin
- Studio: Nucleus Studios
- Genre: Pop
- Length: 4:06
- Label: Starwatch; Cheyenne; Warner
- Songwriter(s): Thanh Bui; Gary Pinto; Rodney Mark Davies
- Producer(s): Pete Kirtley; Andrew Murray; Christian Ballard

Monrose singles chronology
"This Is Me" (2010)	"Breathe You In" (2010)

"Breathe You in" is a song by German girl group Monrose. It was written by Thanh Bui, Rodney Mark Davies, and Gary Pinto and recorded by Monrose for their fourth studio album Ladylike (2010), while production was helmed by frequent collaborators Pete Kirtley as well as Andrew Murray and Christian Ballard from production duo Snowflakers. An uplifting piano-led ballad with minor contemporary R&B elements, "Breathe You In" is built upon a harp motif. Lyrically, it chronicles a woman's love for a man.

Released as the album's third single on 3 December 2010, "Breathe You In" also served as the group's farewell single following the announcement of their disbandment on 25 November 2010. Commercially, it peaked at number 60 on the German Singles Chart, becoming their least successful single. Monrose performed "Breathe You In" at The Dome 56 on 26 November 2010 in front of an audience of 10.000 people. They also performed the song at the Popstars: Girls forever final on 9 December 2010.

== Composition ==
"Breathe You In" is a pop ballad. Vocally, the song follows the typical ballad style of Monrose. The song contains acoustic guitar, strings and piano. About the song, Monrose stated "We knew from the beginning that "Breathe You In" has to be on our album! The text affects! The song makes your skin crawl – and our fans love it!"

== Critical reception ==
LetMeEntertainYou.de gave the song a positive review, stating that "In the ballad, the girls show what they have vocal within." Laut.de stated that the song is too similar to their past ballads. Albert Ranner from CDSTARTS.de wrote that ""Breathe You In" starts like a trashy Whitney Houston clipping, but raises, despite it's [sic] randomness, in the song structure.

== Music video ==
The music video for "Breathe You In" premiered on 25 November 2010 on the group's official YouTube channel, and on 26 November 2010 on VIVA Germany. The video shows a footage of the group and contains pictures of their casting, pictures from their childhood, concert cuttings and home videos.

== B-side ==
The b-side of the single will be the song "Endlich Seh' Ich Das Licht". The song is the German version of "I See The Light" and is featured on the German edition of the film "Tangled", where it will be played during the end credits. The song also appears on the German soundtrack release of "Tangled".

== Track listings ==
CD single
No.	Title	Writer(s)	Producer(s)	Length
1.	"Breathe You In"	Thanh Bui; Gary Pinto; Rodney Mark Davies	Pete Kirtley; Andrew Murray; Christian Ballard	4:06
2.	"Endlich seh' ich das Lich"	Alan Menken; Glenn Slater; Tommy Amper	Menken; Frank Wolf	3:46

== Credits and personnel ==
Credits adapted from the liner notes of Ladylike.

- Christian Ballard – drums, production
- Thanh Bui – writing
- Mandy Capristo – vocals
- Rodney Mark Davies – writing
- Senna Gammour – vocals
- Jonas Jeberg – writing
- Neil Jones – guitar
- Pete Kirtley – bass, production
- Bahar Kızıl – vocals
- Andrew Murray – keyboards, production
- Gary Pinto – writing
- Jackie Rawe – backing vocalist
- Ren Swan – mixing
- Jonas Zadow – recording

== Charts ==
Chart performance for "Breathe You In"
Chart (2010)	Peak position
Germany (GfK)	60

== Release history ==
"Breathe You In" release history
Region	Date	Format(s)	Label	Ref(s)
Austria	December 3, 2010	CD single; download	Starwatch; Cheyenne; Warner	
Germany	December 3, 2010	CD single; download	Starwatch; Cheyenne; Warner	
Switzerland	December 3, 2010	CD single; download	Starwatch; Cheyenne; Warner	
