= This Is Me (Monrose song) =

Single by Monrose

from the album Ladylike
- Released: 27 August 2010
- Recorded: Munich
- Studio: Weryton Studios
- Genre: Dance-pop
- Length: 3:39
- Label: Starwatch; Cheyenne; Warner
- Songwriter(s): Mich Hansen; Jonas Jeberg; Paul Barry; Shaznay Lewis
- Producer(s): Pete Kirtley; Christian Buettner; Marcello Pagin

Monrose singles chronology
"Like a Lady" (2010)	"This Is Me" (2010)	"Breathe You in" (2010)

"This Is Me" is a song performed by German girl band Monrose. It was written by Mich Hansen, Jonas Jeberg, Paul Barry and All Saints band member Shaznay Lewis and recorded for the trio's fourth studio album Ladylike (2010). Production was overseen by Pete Kirtley, Christian "TheFatRat" Buettner and Marcello "Cello" Pagin. Introduced by an a cappella solo by band member Mandy Capristo, who also serves as the song's leading vocalist during its chorus, "This Is Me" is a pumping dance-pop song with heavy elements of synthpop and electronic music; its lyrics explore themes of self-confidence, independence and stamina.

Starwatch Music released the song as the album's second single and band's tenth overall single on 27 August 2010, following an online poll on Monrose's official website that was set up to determine which of the album's tracks was the favourite of fans, beating out "Breathe You In" and "Mono". Upon its release, the song became a moderate commercial success, peaking at number 22 on the German Singles Chart and at number 28 on the Austrian Singles Chart. Its accompanying music video was filmed by director Lennart Brede in Friedrichshain-Kreuzberg and It features a rotating triple split-screen effect.

== Music video ==
The accompanying music video for "This Is Me" was directed by Lennart Brede and filmed on August 1, 2010 in the Berlin borough of Friedrichshain-Kreuzberg. It features a rotating triple split-screen effect which critics compared to the music video for American girl band Destiny's Child's "Emotion" (2001). Filming locations include Warschauer Brücke, Warschauer Straße, Falkensteinstraße, Luisenstadt Canal, and U-Bahn station Schlesisches Tor. Production was helmed by Mutter & Vater Productions, while editing was overseen by Chris Heidrich.

== Track listings ==
CD single
No.	Title	Writer(s)	Producer(s)	Length
1.	"This Is Me"	Mich Hansen; Jonas Jeberg; Paul Michael Berry; Shaznay Lewis	Pete Kirtley; Christian "TheFatRat" Buettner; Marcello "Cello" Pagin	3:39
2.	"Superstar DJ" (Acoustic Version)	Pagin; Buettner; Alistair Tennant	Pagin; Buettner	3:32

Digital EP
No.	Title	Writer(s)	Producer(s)	Length
1.	"This Is Me"	Hansen; Jeberg; Berry; Lewis	Kirtley; Buettner; Pagin	3:39
2.	"Superstar DJ" (Acoustic Version)	Pagin; Buettner; Tennant	Pagin; Buettner	3:32
3.	"This Is Me" (Louis Carpaccio Remix)	Hansen; Jeberg; Berry; Lewis	Kirtley; Buettner; Pagin; Louis Carpaccio^{[A]}	6:01
4.	"This Is Me" (Music video)			3:41

Notes

- ^{^[A]} denotes additional producer

== Credits and personnel ==
Credits adapted from the liner notes of Ladylike.

- Paul Barry – writing
- Christian Buettner – mixing, production, programming
- Mandy Capristo – vocals
- Senna Gammour – vocals
- Mich Hansen – writing
- Jonas Jeberg – writing
- Pete Kirtley – production, recording
- Bahar Kızıl – vocals
- Shaznay Lewis – writing
- Marcello Pagin – mixing, production, programming
- Jackie Rawe – backing vocalist

== Charts ==
Chart performance for "This Is Me"
Chart (2010)	Peak position
Austria (Ö3 Austria Top 40)	28
Germany (GfK)	22

== Release history ==
"This Is Me" release history
Region	Date	Format(s)	Label	Ref(s)
Austria	17 August 2010	CD single; download	Starwatch; Cheyenne; Warner	
Germany	17 August 2010	CD single; download	Starwatch; Cheyenne; Warner	
Switzerland	17 August 2010	CD single; download	Starwatch; Cheyenne; Warner	
