= Strictly Physical =

Strictly Phiysical may refer to:

- Strictly Physical (album), a 2007 album by Monrose
  - "Strictly Physical" (song), a song from the album above
