= Hit 'n' Run (Monrose song) =

"Hit 'N' Run"

Single by Monrose

from the album I Am
- Released: 29 September 2008
- Length: 3:11
- Label: Starwatch
- Songwriters: Joel "JoelJoel" Humlén; Sebastian "The Provider" Larsson; Charlie Mason
- Producers: JoelJoel; Oscar Görres

Monrose singles chronology
"Strike the Match" (2008)	"Hit 'N' Run" (2008)	"Why Not Us" (2008)

"Hit 'n' Run" is a song by German pop band Monrose. It was written by Joel "JoelJoel" Humlén, Sebastian "The Provider" Larsson and Charlie Mason and recorded for the group's third studio album I Am (2008), while production was helmed by the former along with and Oscar Görres.

The track was released as the album's second single in Poland on 29 September 2008 and throughout German-speaking Europe on 3 October. It managed to reach the top 30 in Austria and number 16 in Germany, ending the run of the Monrose's consecutive top ten entries in Germany, beginning with 2006's "Shame".

== Promotion ==
Monrose performed the track on a number of occasions, including a performance at the finale of Elite Model Look 2008, a Swiss fashion programme. It was also performed on the qualifying show of German televised singing competition Popstars.

== Music video ==
A music video for "Hit 'n' Run" was directed by Markus Gerwinat and shot on the week commencing 31 August 2008. Set in the 1980s, it features a roller-disco theme in the 80's The visuals premiered on 11 September 2008 on German music network VIVA's show VIVA Live!.

== Track listings ==
2-track CD single
No.	Title	Writer(s)	Producer(s)	Length
1.	"Hit 'n' Run"	Joel "JoelJoel" Humlén; Sebastian "The Provider" Larsson; Charlie Mason	JoelJoel; Oscar Görres	3:11
2.	"No Never"	Rob Davis; Shelly Poole	Jiant; Snowflakers	3:45

== Credits and personnel ==
- Vocals: M. Capristo, S. Guemmour, B. Kızıl
- Music: JoelJoel, The Provider
- Lyrics: Charlie Mason
- Production and mixing: JoelJoel, Oscar Gorres
- Engineering: Tilmann Ilse
  - Assisted by: Christoph Grotjan
- Recorded at Zwischengeschoss Studios, Hamburg, Germany
- Vocal production and recording by Peter Keller

== Charts ==
Chart performance for "Hit 'n' Run"
Chart (2008)	Peak position
Austria (Ö3 Austria Top 40)	29
European Hot 100 Singles (Billboard)	55
Germany (GfK)	16
