= Dreams Come True (S.E.S. song) =

1998 song by S.E.S.

Single by S.E.S.

from the album Sea & Eugene & Shoo
- Language: Korean
- Released: November 23, 1998
- Recorded: 1998
- Studio: SM Digital Recording Studio, Seoul, South Korea
- Genre: K-pop; dance; trip hop
- Length: 4:02
- Label: SM
- Composers: Risto Asikainen; Yoo Young-jin
- Lyricists: Bada; Yoo Young-jin

S.E.S. singles chronology
"Oh, My Love" (1997)	"Dreams Come True" (1998)	"I Love You" (1998)

Music video
- "Dreams Come True" on YouTube

"Dreams Come True" is a song recorded by South Korean girl group S.E.S. from their second studio album, Sea & Eugene & Shoo (1998). The song is a cover of "Rakastuin mä looseriin" ("I Fell in love with a loser"), released in 1996 by Finnish girl group Nylon Beat. It was originally composed by Finnish producer Risto Asikainen, with further composition of the S.E.S. version handled by Yoo Young-jin while the lyrics were by Yoo and group member Bada.

== Background ==
"Dreams Come True" is an adapted version of the song "Like a Fool" (1996) by Finnish pop duo Nylon Beat. It has been described as a smooth dance number with a moderate 1980s synth beat, utilizing synth flute hooks and soft vocal phrasings. SM Entertainment licensed the song from the original composers and reproduced it by adding Korean vocals, sound fills, and newly arranged parts in the last third of the song. The instrumental track (except for the added parts) remains identical to the original, and it retains the melodic and harmonic structure. Its music video was remastered in November 2021.

=== Reception ===
"Dreams Come True" achieved the top spots on several music programs in South Korea during its promotion. In 2021, "Dreams Come True" was ranked number 86 in online portal Melon and newspaper Seoul Shinmun's list of top 100 K-pop songs of all time.

Music program awards
Program	Date
Music Bank	December 8, 1998
Music Bank	January 5, 1999
Music Bank	January 19, 1999
Inkigayo	January 10, 1999
Music Camp	January 23, 1999

=== Cover performances ===
On February 27, 2009, members Taeyeon, Sunny, Yuri and Seohyun of Girls' Generation performed a cover version of "Dreams Come True" during the Music Bank History section of the 500th episode of KBS Music Bank. On September 12, 2015, Sonamoo performed a cover of the song on Show! Music Core. During the 2018 SBS Gayo Daejeon festival, Irene, Seulgi and Joy of Red Velvet and Momo, Chaeyoung and Tzuyu of Twice performed together a cover version of "Dreams Come True" for the 20th anniversary of the single's release.

== Aespa version ==
"Dreams Come True"

Single by Aespa

from the album 2021 Winter SM Town: SMCU Express
- Released: December 20, 2021
- Recorded: 2021
- Genre: Pop
- Length: 3:24
- Label: SM; Dreamus
- Composers: Yoo Young-jin; BoA; Risto Armas Asikainen
- Lyricists: Bada; Yoo Young-jin; BoA

Aespa singles chronology
"Savage" (2021)	"Dreams Come True" (2021)	"Life's Too Short" (2022)

Music video
- "Dreams Come True" on YouTube

"Dreams Come True" was re-recorded by South Korean girl group Aespa and was released by SM Entertainment on December 20, 2021, as part of SM's Remastering Project, and also as the lead single of the album 2021 Winter SM Town: SMCU Express. South Korean singer, BoA, participated in the song's production, choreography and visual aspects. It was later included on the group's second extended play Girls which was released on July 8, 2022.

=== Background ===
On November 4, 2021, SM Entertainment announced that Aespa would be releasing a cover of "Dreams Come True", slated for release in December. The group was additionally set to remake the "Dream Comes True" music video, as part of the agency's "Remastering Project", where younger generation groups would present new versions of older generation music videos. On December 11, 2021, it was revealed that the song and a music video for the group's version would be released on December 20, 2021, as a part of the project. Aespa's member Giselle revealed that the group "have tried to add [their] own colours to the original track".

=== Composition ===
The lyrics for "Dreams Come True" were written by Bada, Yoo Young-jin, BoA and produced by the latter two with Shaun Kim, BXN, and Risto Asikainen. The song is mainly a "crisp" pop song with strong influence from trap and hip hop elements. Aespa's version features a new verse: "Yeah, get it on nah Get it on nah / Let's bring back to Nineties". The remake's unique young energy and contemporary style are added "to build a soundscape that pays homage to S.E.S's artistry whilst also showcasing the vocal prowess of the girl group". Clash described the remake as "a thrilling reinvention" with "scintillating" chorus and "crisp" pop and hip-hop elements added to its production.

=== Music video ===
Aespa as seen in dreamy aesthetics combined with "otherworldly" visuals

An accompanying music video for the song was uploaded to SM's YouTube channel in conjunction with the release of "Dreams Come True"; the video was preceded with a teaser—which was released via the same platform one day earlier. The "otherworldly" visual combines the dreamy aesthetics from S.E.S.'s original music video with their Aespa's edgy, futuristic signature style. In the video, the group is performing the song's choreography from a grand, purple-tinted room filled with alien-like flora to a street-styled contemporary space. Later in another scene, Aespa is seen on a massive skyscraper design platform alongside projections of their virtual versions. The holographic butterflies and wings from the original music video have been retained.

Divyansha Dongre of Rolling Stone India described the video's sets as "futuristic and flamboyant". NME's Gladys Yeo wrote that the "otherworldly new visual" combines "the dreamy aesthetic" from S.E.S.'s original music video with Aespa's "own edgy, futuristic signature style". Writing for Clash, Robin Murray noted the "tightly choreographed video" for its "alien-like flora" surrounding the group.

=== Track listing ===
Digital download / streaming

1. "Dreams Come True" – 3:24
2. "Dreams Come True" (instrumental) – 3:24

=== Credits and personnel ===
Credits adapted from Melon.

Studio

- SM Booming System – recording, digital editing, mixing
- Sonic Korea – mastering

Personnel

- Aespa – vocals, background vocals
- Bada – lyrics
- Yoo Young-jin – lyrics, composition, arrangement, vocal directing, background vocals, recording, digital editing, mixing, music and sound supervisor
- BoA – lyrics, composition, arrangement, vocal directing
- Risto Armas Asikainen – composition
- Shaun Kim – arrangement
- BXN – arrangement
- Jeon Hoon – mastering
- Shin Soo-min – mastering assistant

=== Charts ===
Weekly charts
Chart (2021–2022)	Peak position
Global 200 (Billboard)	197
Singapore Top Regional (RIAS)	8
South Korea (Circle)	8
South Korea (K-pop Hot 100)	5
US World Digital Songs (Billboard)	7
Vietnam (Vietnam Hot 100)	47

Monthly charts
Chart (2022)	Peak position
South Korea (Circle)	8

Year-end charts
Chart (2022)	Peak position
South Korea (Circle)	64

=== Certifications ===
Certifications for "Dreams Come True" by Aespa
Region	Certification	Certified units/sales
Streaming
Japan (RIAJ)	Gold	50,000,000^{†}
^{†} Streaming-only figures based on certification alone.

=== Release history ===
Release dates and formats for "Dreams Come True"
Region	Date	Format(s)	Label(s)	Ref.
Various	December 20, 2021	Digital download; streaming	SM; Dreamus	
