= Nylon Beat =

Finnish girl group

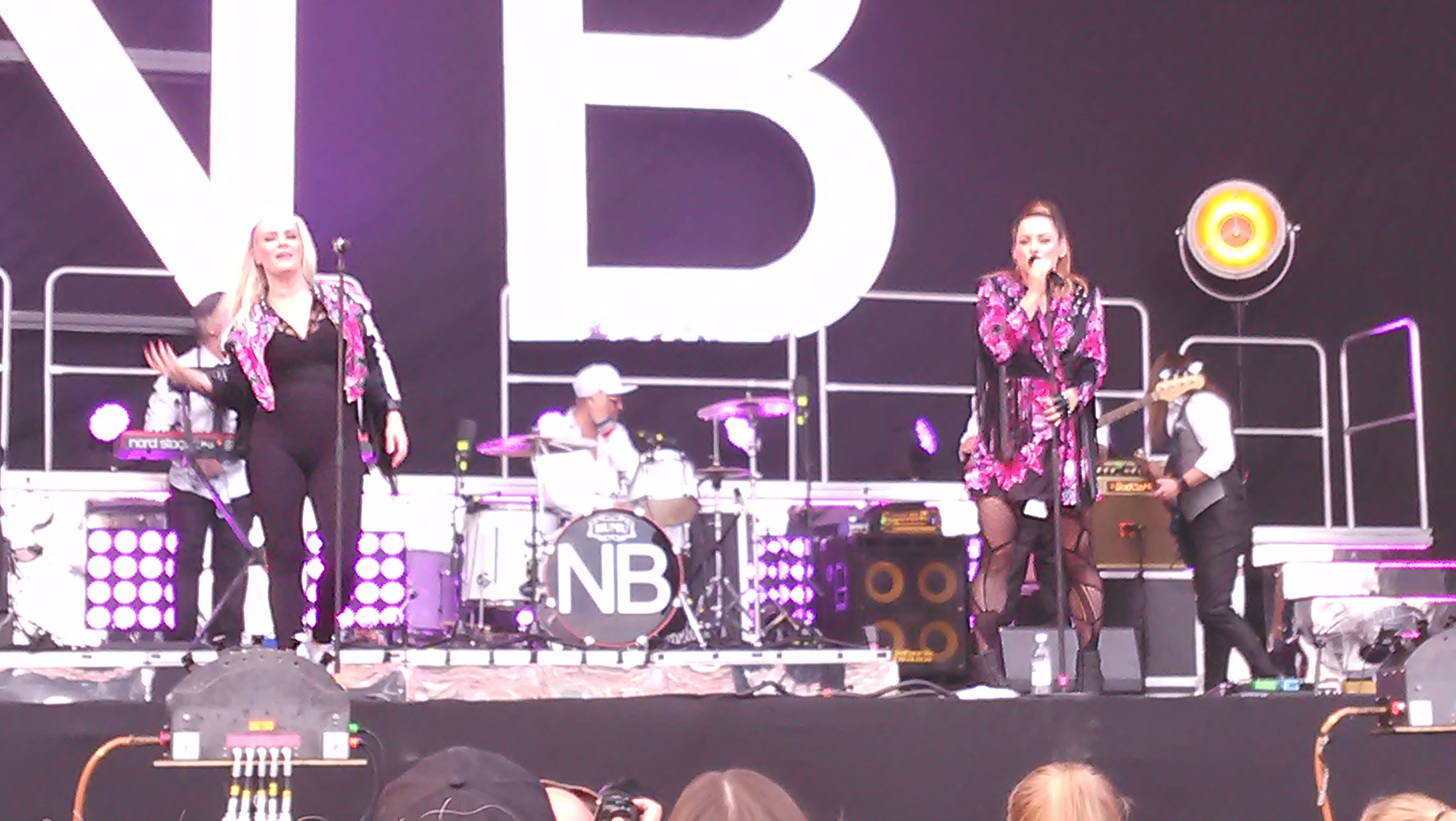
- Nylon Beat on the Suomipop Festival in Jyväskylä, July 13, 2018

Background information
- Origin: Finland
- Genre: Pop
- Years active: 1995–2003, 2007, 2018, 2020, 2026
- Labels: MTV3; Suomen Mediamusiikki
- Past members: Jonna Kosonen; Erin Koivisto

Nylon Beat is a Finnish girl group consisting of Jonna Kosonen and Erin Koivisto (later known as Erin during her solo career). Their main period of popularity was during the late 1990s and early 2000s.

== History ==
The band was formed in 1995 as a result of the TV show Kiitorata ("runway" in English). At that time, both girls were only 18 years old. They started with backup tracks and dancers. Later their music matured somewhat and finally they performed fully live with a band of professional musicians. Most of the music was written by Risto Asikainen and Ilkka Vainio and produced by Asikainen.

The duo received eight gold and seven platinum records and the Band of the Year 1999 Emma award during their active career (1995–2003).

Other artists have covered Nylon Beat songs, most notably the South Korean K-pop girl groups S.E.S. and Aespa, whose 1998 and 2021 versions respectively called "Dreams Come True" retains an almost intact beat and melody of the original "Rakastuin mä looseriin" ("Like a Fool") song from 1996.

Although the duo nominally had already given their final concert on New Year's Eve 2003, they reformed again to perform as an opening act during two Toto gigs; the first on August 17, 2007 in Oulu, and the second on August 18, 2007 in Tampere.

== Discography ==
=== Albums ===
Year	Album	Notes	Peak positions	Certification
Year	Album	Notes	FIN	Certification
1996	Nylon Beat		6	
1997	Satasen laina		7	
1998	Nylon Moon	First English album	–	
1999	Valehtelija		1	
2000	Demo		2	
2001	Extreme		3	
2002	Last in Line	Second English album	21	
2003	12 apinaa		3	

Compilation albums

Year	Album	Notes	Peak positions	Certification
Year	Album	Notes	FIN	Certification
2004	Comeback - 40 hittiä	2-CD compilation	2	
2007	Maailman pisin luokkaretki		15	

Live albums

Year	Album	Notes	Peak positions	Certification
Year	Album	Notes	FIN	Certification
2004	Hyvää uutta vuotta - Live	CD + DVD	39	

=== Singles ===
Charting singles

Year	Single	Peak positions	Album
Year	Single	FIN	Album
1996	"Rakastuin mä looseriin" (“Like a Fool”)	8	
1998	"Viimeinen"	1	
1999	"Seksi vie ja taksi tuo" / "Liikaa"	9	
1999	"Musta joulu"	10	
2000	"Viha ja rakkaus"	5	
2000	"Syytön"	16	
2001	"Anna mulle"	2	
2003	"12 apinaa"	4	12 apinaa
2004	"Comeback"	5	Comeback - 40 hittiä

Other non-charting singles

- 1995: "Oot kuin karkkia mulle"
- 1996: "Teflon Love"
- 1996: "Lä-lä-lä"
- 1997: "Satasen laina"
- 1997: "Kuumalle hiekalle"
- 1997: "Jos"
- 1998: "Like a Fool"
- 1998: "Umm ma ma"
- 1999: "Ainut jonka sain"
- 2000: "Syntinen"
- 2001: "Guilty"
- 2002: "Sanoja"
- 2002: "Moka"
- 2002: "Last in Line" / "Eternal Love"
- 2003: "Petollinen päiväkirja"
- 2003: "Nukutaan"
- 2003: "Kevytlinja" / "Psykedeliaa"
- 2004: "Kuumalle Hiekalle" (remix)
- 2004: "Teflon Love" (live)
- 2007: "Seksi vie 12 apinaa kuumalle hiekalle"

As featured artist

Year	Single	Peak positions	Album
Year	Single	FIN	Album
2003	"Uudestaan" (Sere featuring Nylon Beat)	17	

== See also ==
- List of best-selling music artists in Finland
