= Tim Hawes =

English musician (born 1965)

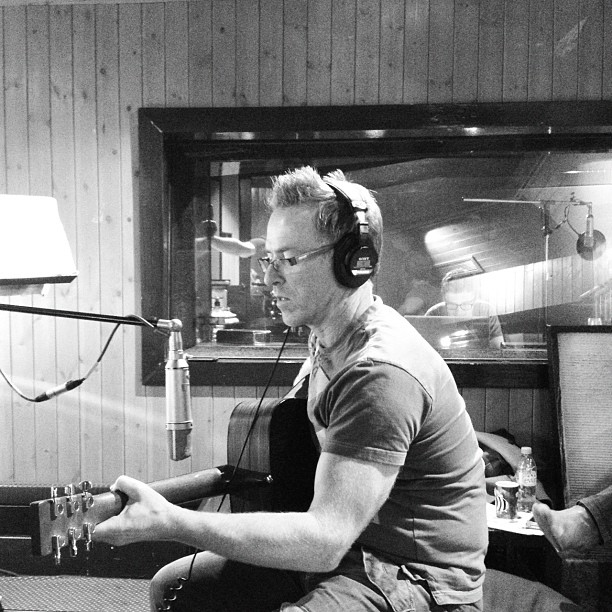

Background information
- Born: Tim Hawes; 30 April 1965 (age 61)
- Origin: Windlesham, Surrey, England
- Occupations: Songwriter producer Publisher

Tim Hawes (born 30 April 1965) is an English born songwriter, record producer and music publisher who has achieved in excess of ten million record sales including five number one singles. He is also a recipient of the prestigious Ivor Novello award for songwriting. Hawes is known for his work with the Spice Girls, Five, Hear'Say, Sugababes, Mutya Buena, Monrose, Aaron Carter, No Angels, Cinema Bizarre, Aggro Santos, Jimmy Blue and Stefanie Heinzmann.

Hawes is currently CEO / partner of Zebra1.

== Early life ==
Hawes was born in Windlesham, Surrey in 1965. Brought up on a heavy dose of The Beatles and The Four Tops supplied by his mother, Hawes soon became switched on to pop music. Learning guitar at the age of 13 Hawes combined his already noticed talent for poetry with his newfound musicality and started writing songs.

== Career ==
=== Songwriting and production ===
From the mid-1980s and through to the mid-1990s, Hawes toured extensively in bands and had a single release on MCA records with alternative rock band Fra. The single failed to surface but the writing talents of Hawes came to the attention of Chris Herbert and Bob Herbert, father and son management team Safe Management who invited him to write for their artists. Safe had been responsible for the development of Bros and went on to put together The Spice Girls for whom Hawes penned three songs including "Sugar and Spice" the song which inspired Hawes to suggest the name "The Spice Girls". His involvement on the project led Hawes into a publishing deal with BMG and a period of writing which included the song "Satisfied" which featured on the 3.5 million selling debut album of boyband Five. The song also appeared on the US single release of "Slam Dunk Da Funk" which was a top ten billboard hit. Hawes's association with Safe Management led to an introduction to and subsequently long term writing and production partnership with Pete Kirtley. Together they formed Jiant in 1999 and quickly made their mark with a release on Aaron Carters 3 million selling album Aaron's Party. This was followed by two songs being recorded by Boyzone star Stephen Gately. In 2001 Hawes and Kirtley penned a song which was in the final for "A Song for Europe" and resulted in the signing of artist Anniq to Telstar Records. Telstar went bust before the release of "Skin Deep" but the song went on to be featured in a worldwide ad campaign for Lacoste. 2001 also saw the release of the Hawes/Kirtley/Clarkson written "Pure and Simple" by Popstars winners Hear'Say which Jiant produced for Polydor. The song found its place in the Guinness Book of Records that year as the fastest selling debut single of all time. It went on to sell 1.3 million copies and Hawes and his co writers each received an Ivor Novello for their work. Jiant scored a second number one with Hear'Say's "Show me the way", a co production with Stargate. A third number one came with No Angel (It's All in Your Mind) released by German garland No Angels. Hawes went on to work with Mis-Teeq, S Club 7 and Gareth Gates as well as having notable releases with the Sugababes and Mutya Buena. In 2006 Hawes scored a fourth number one with "Shame" released by German band Monrose and went on to write and produce songs for their album Temptation and subsequent albums Strictly Physical and Ladylike. The Jiant partnership of Hawes and Kirtley ended in 2007 and Hawes went on to form Zebra1 with songwriter and producer Obi Mhondera. The Zebra1 partnership saw Hawes writing and producing for Joana Zimmer, most notably the Hawes/Bachman written song "What is the Good in Goodbye". Further releases with Cinema Bizarre, Monrose, Jimmy Blue, Tata Young, Stefanie Heinzmann and Aggro Santos cemented the Hawes/Mhondera writing and production partnership which continues to present.

=== Publishing company ===
In 2011, Zebra1 set up a music publishing company in partnership with Bucks Music. The company Zebra1/Bucks Music Publishing have since signed writer/producer Willie Weeks, writer Harry Brooks and The White Collar Criminals, a South African-based team responsible for the music for many films and TV adverts. Zebra1 currently develop many new writers, producers and artists as well as continuing to write and produce songs for many major artists.
