= Vital Signs (TV series) =

British television series

- Genre: Medical drama
- Created by: John Forte; Chris Lang
- Directed by: Charles Palmer; Renny Rye
- Starring: Tamzin Outhwaite; Steven Waddington; Anton Lesser; Beth Goddard; Claudie Blakley; Eve Best; William Beck; Ruth Sheen
- Theme music composer: Alexis Strum
- Opening theme: "Go Your Own Way"
- Country of origin: United Kingdom
- Original language: English
- No. of series: 1
- No. of episodes: 6

Production
- Executive producer: Foz Allen
- Producer: Kate Crowe
- Running time: 50 minutes
- Production company: Tiger Aspect Productions

Original release
- Network: ITV
- Release: 20 April – 25 May 2006

Vital Signs is a medical British television drama series that first aired on ITV on 20 April 2006. The series stars Tamzin Outhwaite as Rhoda Bradley, a supermarket check-out operator who decides to become a doctor after her son is diagnosed with cystic fibrosis. The series follows Rhoda's experiences going through training at medical school, to coping with real life or death situations in a hospital environment.

Alongside Outhwaite, Steven Waddington plays her husband, Tony, with Anton Lesser, William Beck, Eve Best, Claudie Blakley, Lucinda Dryzek, Beth Goddard and Ruth Sheen all appearing in prominent roles. The series was commissioned in August 2005, with filming taking place in a number of London hospitals, but most prominently St George's Hospital; scenes were also filmed at St George's University Medical School.

The theme to the series, "Go My Own Way" by Alexis Strum, was produced by Magnus Fiennes and taken from Strum's second album Cocoon. The series was released on Region 2 DVD on 15 January 2007.

== Cast ==
- Tamzin Outhwaite as Rhoda Bradley
- Steven Waddington as Tony Bradley
- Anton Lesser as Dr Lindsay
- Beth Goddard as Sister Maddy McCartney
- Claudie Blakley as Nurse Jules Chapman
- Eve Best as Sarah Cartwright
- William Beck as Billy Britten
- Ruth Sheen as Valerie McCabe
- Harry Lloyd as Jason Bradley
- Alfie Hunter as Rory Bradley
- Lucinda Dryzek as Lexie Bradley
- Fraser Ayres as Vinnie Delaney
- Steve Nicolson as Merv Chapman
- Daniel Percival as Will Massey
- Gugu Mbatha-Raw as Eve

== Episodes ==
No.	Title	Directed by	Written by	Original release date	UK viewers (millions)
1	"Episode 1"	Charlie Palmer	John Forte	20 April 2006	5.17
2	"Episode 2"	Charlie Palmer	John Forte	27 April 2006	4.55
3	"Episode 3"	Charlie Palmer	John Forte	4 May 2006	4.20
4	"Episode 4"	Renny Rye	Chris Lang	11 May 2006	3.98
5	"Episode 5"	Renny Rye	John Forte	18 May 2006	3.04
6	"Episode 6"	Renny Rye	John Forte	25 May 2006	3.34
