= Remastering Project =

Music video remastering project

- Type of project: Remastering
- Owner: SM; YouTube
- Country: South Korea
- Established: November 4, 2021
- Website: smtown.com/production/remastering

Remastering Project (Korean: 리마스터링 프로젝트) is a music video remastering project by South Korean record label SM Entertainment and YouTube. The project intends to remaster music videos from the 1990s to the 2010s. It also plans to showcase the history of K-pop to international music fans to contribute to the growth of the Korean music industry. Remastered music videos were sequentially released starting from November 4, 2021 and stopped on April 11, 2023.

== History ==
Through SM Congress 2021, SM Entertainment's chief executive officer (CEO), Lee Sung-soo, introduces the company's plan in advancing into the K-pop 2.0 era with prosumers who created original content and Re-Created content. The said plan will carry out various projects such as the company's remastering project for music and music videos, Pink Blood project to promote and support prosumers, and SM Classics. H.O.T. member, Kangta, introduced SM's Remastering Project, where music videos that have been released in the past will be remastered with new quality, planning, and visuals. Kangta stated that one could feel the "freshness" of that era looking at a quality of 4K resolution. He further revealed that SM then joined hands with YouTube to showcase the history of K-pop and introduce it through the online video platform to contribute to the growth of the Korean music industry.

Through an online press conference held on November 4, 2021, SM Entertainment and YouTube announced the remastering project for K-pop music videos. The Remastering Project is a project to remaster music videos from the 1990s and 2000s and showcase them to global music fans through the online video platform. It is planned to introduce the history of K-pop to international music fans by conducting various campaigns using YouTube. YouTube will release music videos of various K-pop artists through cooperation with the distributors and agencies such as Ogam Entertainment, Genie Music, Collab Asia, the Recording Industry Association of Korea, and NHN Bugs, with more suitable quality for digital platforms. Moreover, the two companies will also collaborate with various YouTube creators to promote the project.

== Videography ==
For the project, SM Entertainment plans to showcase more than 300 remastered music videos and songs on YouTube's original channel as it is considered a "valuable asset" of the company and part of the K-pop history that "cannot be found anywhere else". Music videos of about 50 artists will be released sequentially every week starting from November 4, 2021 under the themes of 1990s dance and 2000s dance & hip-hop. The last one to be released was f(x)'s La Cha Ta, released on April 11, 2023.

=== Remaster ===
List of remastered music videos, showing artists, year released, and remastered release date
Title	Artist	Year	Remastered release date	Ref.
"Age of Violence" (전사의 후예 (폭력시대))	H.O.T.	1996	November 4, 2021	
"Dreams Come True"	S.E.S.	1998	November 11, 2021	
"Only One"	Shinhwa	2000	November 18, 2021	
"Intro + Day by Day"	Fly to the Sky	1999	November 25, 2021	
"The Promise of H.O.T." (우리들 맹세)	H.O.T.	1998	November 26, 2021	
"ID; Peace B"	BoA	2000	December 2, 2021	
"Agape" (...지애 (之愛))	Yoo Young-jin	2001	December 9, 2021	
"Angel Eyes"	SM Town	2001	December 16, 2021	
"Hope" (빛)	H.O.T.	1998	December 23, 2021	
"U"	Super Junior	2006	January 14, 2022	
"Into the New World" (다시 만난 세계)	Girls' Generation	2007	January 21, 2022	
"Perfect Man"	Shinhwa	2002	February 3, 2022	
"In The Sky"	Black Beat	2002	February 10, 2022	
"Come To Me"	M.I.L.K.	2001	February 17, 2022	
"I yah!" (아이야!)	H.O.T.	1999	February 24, 2022	
"My Name"	BoA	2004	March 2, 2022	
"I'm Your Girl"	S.E.S.	1997	March 10, 2022	
"Too Good"	The Grace	2005	March 16, 2022	
"Missing You"	Fly to the Sky	2003	March 24, 2022	
"I Swear"	S	2003	March 31, 2022	
"Hug"	TVXQ	2004	April 6, 2022	
"Show Me Your Love" (감싸 안으며)	S.E.S.	2000	April 14, 2022	
"Replay" (누난 너무 예뻐)	Shinee	2008	April 20, 2022	
"Paradox"	TRAX	2004	May 4, 2022	
"Tri-Angle"	TVXQ featuring BoA and TRAX	2004	May 11, 2022	
"Full of Happiness" (행복)	H.O.T.	1997	May 19, 2022	
"Yo!" (악동보고서)	Shinhwa	1999	May 26, 2022	
"Gee"	Girls' Generation	2009	June 2, 2022	
"Scandal"	Kangta & Vanness	2006	June 8, 2022	
"Just In Love"	S.E.S.	2001	June 16, 2022	
"Summer Vacation"	SM Town	2002	June 23, 2022	
"Hello! Summer!"	SM Town	2003	June 30, 2022	
"Hero"	Shinhwa	2002	July 7, 2022	
"Hot Mail"	SM Town	2004	July 14, 2022	
"Dancing Out"	Super Junior	2006	July 20, 2022	
"Red Sun" (태양은 가득히)	SM Town	2006	July 28, 2022	
"Drive"	TVXQ	2004	August 3, 2022	
"Sea of Love"	Fly to the Sky	2002	August 18, 2022	
"Haengbok" (행복)	Super Junior	2007	August 27, 2022	
"Girls on Top"	BoA	2005	September 2, 2022	
"Hi Ya Ya!"	TVXQ	2005	September 13, 2022	
"I Pray 4 U"	Shinhwa	2002	September 22, 2022	
"Love"	S.E.S.	1999	September 29, 2022	
"Sorry, Sorry"	Super Junior	2009	October 5, 2022	
"Gravity" (중력)	Fly to the Sky	2004	October 12, 2022	
"Outside Castle (The Castle Outsiders)"	H.O.T.	2000	October 19, 2022	
"Sesang Kkeutkkaji" (세상 끝까지)	Dana	2001	October 26, 2022	
"Memories" (사랑은 기억보다)	Kangta	2002	November 10, 2022	
"Timeless"	Zhang Liyin featuring Xiah	2006	November 16, 2022	
"Timeless"	Zhang Liyin featuring Xiah	2006	November 23, 2022	
"Candy"	H.O.T.	1996	December 1, 2022	
"Merry-Chri" (메리-크리)	BoA	2004	December 7, 2022	
"Jingle Bell"	SM Town	1999	December 15, 2022	
"My Angel My Light"	SM Town	2002	December 22, 2022	
"Dear My Family"	SM Town	2002	December 29, 2022	
"Rising Sun"	TVXQ	2005	January 13, 2023	
"One"	Isak N Jiyeon	2002	January 19, 2023	
"La Cha Ta"	f(x)	2009	April 11, 2023	

=== Remake ===
List of remade music videos, showing original and remake artists, and year released
Title	Artist		Year	Ref.
Title	Original	Remake	Year	Ref.
"Free To Fly 2021" (자유롭게 날 수 있도록 2021)	H.O.T.	Kangta	2021	
"Dreams Come True"	S.E.S.	Aespa	2021	
"Candy"	H.O.T.	NCT Dream	2022	
