= SoShy =

French singer-songwriter

- Born: Deborah Sarah Epstein; 14 September 1984 (age 42); Paris
- Genres: Contemporary, pop, soul
- Occupations: Singer, songwriter, actress, disc jockey
- Years active: 2000–present
- Labels: Sphere Musique, eOne Music, Mosley Music Group, Interscope Records, Universal Music Group, Daylight Records
- Website: https://www.facebook.com/soshymusic

SoShy (born Deborah Sarah Epstein) is a French singer, songwriter, actress and DJ.

== Early life ==
SoShy was born Deborah Sarah Epstein in Paris, France, on September 14, 1984, to an Italian Argentine mother and a Russian Ukrainian father. Her early childhood was spent in New York City and Los Angeles.

== Career ==
SoShy, who began her career as an actress, soon discovered the art of DJing, which she did for several years. She also started singing in clubs at the age of fifteen. She then met Lone, a French producer in 2003, and from there signed a deal with Sony Music/Daylight New York. Since signing, SoShy has traveled the world for her debut album, co-writing with artists including BloodShy, Sam Waters, Walter Turbitt, Mark Ronson, Cool and Dre, Steve Kipner, Estelle, Jim Beanz, Michelle Bell, Kovas, Novel and more. She was also featured at the 2005 and 2007 MUSEXPO music conferences.

SoShy co-wrote "Strike the Match" with Ryan Tedder, from the group One Republic, for the ECHO Music Awards nominated German all-female pop band Monrose.

"Appetite for Love" was written in Gunnersbury, London in 2004 with former members of the rock group Rising Times and producer Guz Lally after songwriting stalwart Wayne Hector declined the session. The title was paraphrased from the hard rock group Guns N' Roses' debut album.

In addition, she wrote a song for the American pop rock singer Chris Cornell for his 2009 album Scream. Also in 2009 she wrote the song "Elvis", sung by the Belgian group Leki & The Sweet Mints.

SoShy was signed to Timbaland's MosleyMusic Group/Interscope/Universal Music Group through Jimmy Iovine.

She can be heard on "Morning After Dark" which she co-wrote, the first single from Timbaland's 2009 album Shock Value II. Her single "Dorothy" was featured on the FIFA 10 and her song "The Way I" was featured on The Official Soundtrack of FIFA 06. Soon after, they intensively promoted the hit single by performing live on TV for the MTV Music Awards, Conan O'Brien Tonight Show, followed by many live shows, such as House of Blues Los Angeles and also throughout the world.

She then signed to Sphere Musique/eOne Music in Canada from 2012 to 2014. Her debut album Crack The Code was released September 9, 2014 worldwide. The first two lead singles ("Whateva Man" and "City Of Angels") are now available on iTunes. The video for "Whateva Man" premiered on Vevo September 3, 2014.

She is currently working on her new album as well as going back to her acting and DJing career.

== Discography ==
=== Studio albums ===
List of independent albums, with track listings.
| Title | Album details |
|---|---|
| Crack the Code | Released: September 9, 2014; Label: Sphere Musique; Formats: digital download; Track listing: 1. "All Aboard"; 2. "Let the Shy Shout"; 3. "Whateva Man" (feat. Novel); 4. "Relationship"; 5. "Hello" (feat. Saukrates); 6. "City of Angels"; 7. "Honest Liar"; 8. "Bang Bang"; 9. "Dorothy"; 10. "Never Over"; 11. "I Think We Landed"; Deluxe Edition; 12. "Speechless"; 13. "Swim With the Birds" |

=== Solo singles ===
| Year | Song | Album(s) |
|---|---|---|
| 2005 | "The Way I" | FIFA 06 soundtrack |
| 2009 | "Dorothy" | FIFA 10 soundtrack |
| 2014 | "Whateva Man" | Crack The Code |
| 2014 | "City Of Angels | Crack The Code |

=== As featured artist ===
| Year | Song | Chart positions | | | | | | | | | | | Album |
| Year | Song | US | UK | AUS | NZ | GER | FRA | Canada | NET | IRE | NOR | EU | Album |
|---|---|---|---|---|---|---|---|---|---|---|---|---|---|
| 2009 | "Morning After Dark" (Timbaland feat. Nelly Furtado and SoShy) | 61 | 6 | 19 | — | 6 | 13 | 8 | 21 | 11 | 13 | 8 | Shock Value II |
| 2015 | "Back To Myself" (AZ feat. SoShy) | — | — | — | — | — | — | — | — | — | — | — | |
| 2016 | "Shine Upon You" (Inmensus feat. SoShy) | — | — | — | — | — | — | — | — | — | — | — | |
| 2017 | "Back to the House" (Junior Sanchez feat. SoShy) | — | — | — | — | — | — | — | — | — | — | — | Under The Influence |
| 2017 | "Dreaming" (Junior Sanchez feat. SoShy) | — | — | — | — | — | — | — | — | — | — | — | Under The Influence |

=== Remixes ===
- "Morning After Dark (Chew Fu 2016 B-Boy Fix Remix)" (with Nelly Furtado & SoShy)
- "Morning After Dark (French Version) (with Nelly Furtado & SoShy)

=== Other appearances ===
| Year | Song | Artist | Album(s) | Notes |
|---|---|---|---|---|
| 2009 | "Ease Off The Liquor" | Timbaland | Shock Value II | (additional vocals) |
| 2015 | "Black Night" | Dembiak Music | Alternatives | |
| 2015 | "Don't Stomp On Me" | Dembiak Music | Alternatives | |
| 2015 | "Oh Boy" | Dembiak Music | Alternatives | |
| 2015 | "Floored" | Dembiak Music | Alternatives | |
| 2016 | "Cloudy Peninsula" | Kawnar | The Giant | |
| 2016 | "Which Way To Go" | Junior Sanchez | 10 Years of Viva Music: Decadedance Part One – EP | |
| 2017 | "Back To House" | Junior Sanchez | Under The Influence | |
| 2017 | "Dreaming" | Junior Sanchez | Under The Influence | |
| 2017 | "Dirty Housewife" | Junior Sanchez | Under The Influence | |
| 2017 | "Amor De Mi Vida" | Junior Sanchez | Under The Influence | |

=== Writing credits ===
| Year | Song | Artist | Album(s) | Notes |
|---|---|---|---|---|
| 2006 | "Strike The Match" | Monrose | I Am | Co-writer of the song with Ryan Tedder |
| 2006 | "Appetite For Love" | Natalia | Everything and More | Co-writer of the song with Cameron Jean-Laing; Lee Macdougall; Gulzar Singh Lally |
| 2009 | "Lost Cause" | Chris Cornell | Scream | writer of the song |
| 2009 | "Elvis" | "Leki & The Sweet Mints" | Leki & The Sweet Mints | writer of the song |
