= Strike the Match =

Single by Monrose

from the album I Am
- Released: 6 June 2008
- Length: 2:55
- Label: Starwatch
- Songwriters: Deborah "Soshy" Epstein; Ryan Tedder
- Producer: Ryan Tedder

Monrose singles chronology
"What You Don't Know" (2008)	"Strike the Match" (2008)	"Hit'n'Run" (2008)

"Strike the Match" is a song by German pop trio Monrose. It was written by OneRepublic frontman Ryan Tedder and singer Deborah "SoShy" Epstein and recorded for the group's third studio album I Am (2008). Production on the track was helmed by Tedder, with additional production provided by Christian Ballard, Pete Kirtley, and Andrew Murray.

The song premiered on 23 May 2008 on German radio network Planet Radio and was first performed on the final episode of Germany's Next Topmodel, Cycle 3 on 5 June. On 6 June 2008, it was released by Starwatch Music as the lead single from I Am. Following its physical single release, "Strike the Match" debuted at number 10 on the German Singles Chart and within the top 20 in Austria and Switzerland. It also reached the top 40 on a composite Eurochart.

== Background ==
"Strike the Match" was written by OneRepublic frontman Ryan Tedder and singer Deborah "SoShy" Epstein. Though not specifically written for Monrose, it was selected out of several demos. Band member Bahar Kizil commented on the record: "The song is a huge step [for us]. We're trying to bring summer back, similar to "Hot Summer". The song is very, very hot. It's a feel-good song."

== Chart performance ==
"Strike the Match" was released by Starwatch Music on 6 June 2008 as the lead single from Monrose's third studio album I Am (2008). It debuted and peaked at number ten on the German Singles Chart in the week of 20 June 2008, becoming the band's sixth consecutive top ten hit. The song would spend ten weeks inside the top 100 of the chart. GfK ranked it 94th on its 2008 year-end singles chart. In Switzerland, the song peaked at number 11, becoming the group's highest-charting single since "Hot Summer." In Austria, "Strike the Match" became Monrose's third consecutive single to reach number 16 on the Austrian Singles Chart. Elsewhere, it peaked at number seven on Billboard's European Hot 100 Singles.

== Music video ==
A music video for "Strike the Match" was filmed in Berlin in May 2008. It made its television debut on 29 May on German music network VIVA's show VIVA Live!.

It shows the girls dancing in a club with friends. Other scenes show them in front of a car at night, and in a digital black and white city.

== Track listings ==
CD maxi-single
No.	Title	Writer(s)	Producer(s)	Length
1.	"Strike the Match"	Ryan Tedder; Deborah Epstein	Tedder; Andrew Murray^{[a]}; Christian Ballard^{[a]}	2:55
2.	"After Making Love"	TJ Cases	TJ Cases; Peter Killer^{[b]}	4:30
3.	"Strike the Match" (Instrumental)	Tedder; Epstein	Tedder; Murray^{[a]}; Ballard^{[a]}	2:54

2-track CD single
No.	Title	Writer(s)	Producer(s)	Length
1.	"Strike the Match"	Tedder; Epstein	Tedder; Murray^{[a]}; Ballard^{[a]}	2:55
2.	"Strike the Match" (Instrumental)	Tedder; Epstein	Tedder; Murray^{[a]}; Ballard^{[a]}	2:54

Notes

- ^{^[a]} denotes co-producer
- ^{^[b]} denotes vocal producer

== Credits and personnel ==
- Christian Ballard – additional producer, instruments, mixing
- Mandy Capristo – vocals
- Senna Gammour – vocals
- Pete Kirtley – additional producer, instruments, recording
- Bahar Kizil – vocals
- Andrew Murray – additional producer, instruments
- Ryan Tedder – engineer, instruments, producer
- Claus Üblacker – vocal editing

== Charts ==
=== Weekly charts ===
Weekly chart performance for "Strike the Match"
Chart (2008)	Peak position
Austria (Ö3 Austria Top 40)	16
European Hot 100 Singles (Billboard)	34
Germany (GfK)	10
Switzerland (Schweizer Hitparade)	11

=== Year-end charts ===
Year-end chart performance for "Strike the Match"
Chart (2008)	Position
Germany (Official German Charts)	94

== Release history ==
Release dates and formats for "Strike the Match
Region	Date	Format	Label	Ref
Various	6 June 2008	CD maxi single; digital download	Starwatch Music; Warner	
