= Elvis (song) =

Single by Leki & The Sweet Mints

from the album Leki & The Sweet Mints
- Released: 2009
- Genre: Soul, Europop
- Label: ARS Entertainment
- Songwriter(s): Deborah Epstein, Laurent Proneur, Walter Turbitt
- Producer(s): King Of Sweden

Leki & The Sweet Mints singles chronology
"Love Me Another Day" (2009)	"Elvis" (2009)	"Obsessive" (2009)

"Elvis" is a song recorded by Belgian R&B group Leki & The Sweet Mints for their album of the same name (2009). It was written by Deborah "SoShy" Epstein, Laurent Pronseur and Walter Turbitt and produced by King Of Sweden.

== Track listing ==
Belgian CD-Single

No.	Title	Length
1.	"Elvis" (Radio Edit)	3:19
2.	"Elvis" (Instrumental)	3:19

== Chart performance ==
Chart (2009)	Peak position
Belgium (Ultratip Flanders)	9

== Credits and personnel ==
- Lead vocals by Leki
- Background Vocals by Kristiina Wheeler and Johanna Försti
- Produced by King Of Sweden
- Co-produced and arranged by Janne Huttunen
- Drums by Mikko Kaakkuriniemi
- Horns by Janne Huttunen and Jukka Eskola
- Bass by Anssi Växby
- Mixed by Mikka Huttunen
- Mastered by Svante Forsbäck
- Keyboards by Janne Huttunen and King Of Sweden
- Programmed by Janne Huttunen and King Of Sweden
- Strings by Anniina Ahlström, Juha-Pekka Koivisto, Kaisa Ivars, Kati Ylitalo, Laura Airola, Mauri Kuokkanen, Riikka Lampinen
