= Dance Dance Dance (German TV series) =

- Genre: Competitive dancing
- Presented by: Jan Köppen & Nazan Eckes
- Judges: Sophia Thomalla; DJ Bobo; Cale Kllay
- Country of origin: Netherlands
- Original language: German
- No. of series: 1
- No. of episodes: 6

Dance Dance Dance is a German competitive dancing talent show that air on RTL.

== Scoring chart ==
Couple	Place	Week 1		
Couple	Place	Duo	Solo	Combined
Philipp Boy; Bene Mayr				
Dana Schweiger; Luna Schweiger				
Lucas Cordalis; Daniela Katzenberger				
Sabia Boulahrouz; Leonard Freier				
Mario Kotaska; Alexander Kumptner				
Aneta Sablik; Menderes Bagci				

Red numbers indicate the lowest score for each week
Green numbers indicate the highest score for each week
the couple eliminated that week
the winning couple
the runner-up couple
the third-place couple

== Weekly scores ==
=== Week 1 ===
Order	Couple / Contestant	Style	Music	Judge 3	Judge 1	Judge 2	Total
01	Aneta Sablik; Menderes Bagci		"You're the One That I Want" - John Travolta & Olivia Newton-John	8.0	7.5	6.5	22.0
02	Mario Kotaska; Alexander Kumptner		"Beat It" - Michael Jackson				
03	Sabia Boulahrouz; Leonard Freier		"On the Floor" - Jennifer Lopez	5.5	5.0	5.0	15.5
04	Philipp Boy; Bene Mayr		"Bye Bye Bye" - NSYNC	8.5	8.5	7.0	24.0
	Dana Schweiger; Luna Schweiger		"Wannabe" - Spice Girls				
	Lucas Cordalis; Daniela Katzenberger		"Uptown Funk" - Mark Ronson feat. Bruno Mars				
Solo Performances
	Dana Schweiger		"Vogue" - Madonna				
	Aneta Sablik		"Welcome to Burlesque" - Christina Aguilera				
	Philipp Boy		"Rock Your Body" - Justin Timberlake				
	Sabia Boulahrouz		"Umbrella" - Rihanna				
	Mario Kotaska		"Gettin' Jiggy wit It" - Will Smith				
	Lucas Cordalis		"You Should Be Dancing" - Bee Gees				
