= Alexis Strum =

English singer

- Born: Chingford, London
- Genres: Pop
- Years active: 2002–present
- Labels: Back on Wax (2026); Absolute Label Services (2025–present); Double J Music (2023–2024); Mercury Records (2005–2006); Warner Bros. Records (2002–2003)
- Website: alexisstrum.com

Alexis Strum is an English songwriter, singer, actress, and writer.

== Biography ==
=== Early life ===
Strum was born and brought up in an Orthodox Jewish family in Chingford, Essex. Aged 6, she began writing songs.

Strum formed local bands, performing Elastica and L7 covers, before experimenting with computer-aided production to emulate the sound of a full live band on her own. She studied English at King's College London, gaining a degree in English Literature. Whilst there she was Music Editor of the university newspaper, Roar, interviewed bands and wrote a fashion and beauty column for the now defunct Insync magazine.

After graduating and working odd jobs around London for a few years, she signed a publishing deal with Mike Sault at Warner Chappell. She sang on tracks by Thrillseekers, Lange, York (where she was credited as 'Alaska' on the German single, "Yesterday (Silence)") and Ed Case until in 2002; she then signed her first solo record contract.

=== Warner and Universal ===
In 2002, Strum recorded an album for Warner Music, with producers such as Xenomania. The album was not released and the lead single, entitled "Addicted," from the album was cancelled due to Lorraine Kelly cancelling Alexis's TV performance after mistaking one of her lyrics to be a drugs reference (the lyric in question related to a flavour of ice cream).

Strum's publishers shopped the songs around; "Still Standing" was recorded by Kylie Minogue for her 2003 album, Body Language and "Nothing Good about This Goodbye" was recorded by Rachel Stevens for her 2005 album, Come and Get It. In 2023, Warner released 10 of the songs from the recording sessions as an album titled Addicted digitally.

Strum signed a deal with Universal Music in 2005, following a spot at the V Festival, and was due to release a debut single, "Bad Haircut". Originally, a song entitled "Why Me, Why Now?" was due to be released, along with remixes but it was scrapped. The video for "Bad Haircut" video features actor Tom Ellis. The album, Cocoon, originally scheduled for release on 10 October 2005, was postponed when the single failed commercially, and a second single was announced, "It Could Be You," co-written by Billy Steinberg, to be released on 13 March 2006 with the album following later. It received only a digital release but did receive a music video.

The third single, "Go My Own Way," was digitally released as the theme song to the short-lived ITV drama series Vital Signs, starring Tamzin Outhwaite. This was released digitally on 22 April 2006.

After the failure of all three singles for the album, the release of Cocoon was cancelled, and Strum was later dropped by Universal Music. The album was eventually released by Double J Music in 2023 on digital, CD and vinyl.

=== Bo Pepper, acting and songwriting ===
Strum was the songwriter, and one of the voices, in the UK indie group Bo Pepper. Their first single, "Blinkandyou'llmissit!", was self-released in 2008 on Peppered Records, and they were named "New Band of the Week" by The Guardian in April 2008.

Strum continued to write songs including "Why Not Us" for the German pop group Monrose (2008). In 2010, her song, "Got a Grip On Me", was featured in the UK Channel 4 comedy, The Inbetweeners.

In 2011 and 2012, Strum toured the UK playing Eva Cassidy's sister, Margaret, in the musical Over the Rainbow – The Eva Cassidy Story. She next starred in an online drama series created for smartphones titled Persona. In 2015, Strum wrote, produced and staged a play titled "Always the Bride" at the New Wimbledon Studio Theatre, about a group of suburban women who all suffer from "post wedding-day comedown and meet in private to wear their wedding dresses to re-live their big day".

In 2018, Strum wrote an autobiography, The Time I Almost.... A documentary based on it was in development.

=== 2025 Eurovision sttempt and 3rd album ===
In 2023, Strum began uploading songs from her unreleased album "Cocoon" to digital platforms and discovered that she owned the masters to her second album, Cocoon. After a viral twitter thread, Double J Music offered a record deal to release the album on all formats. Separately, Warner Music agreed to upload ten tracks that were recorded for Addicted to form a version of her debut album, and released it digitally on 1 September 2023.

In 2025, Strum attempted to enter the Eurovision Song Contest 2025. In a video posted on her social media, she revealed that she initially approached the United Kingdom delegation, expressing interest in representing them in the competition. However, she did not receive a response. Following this, Strum decided to submit an entry to San Marino's national selection process, Una Voce per San Marino 2025, with her song "If You Think I'm Too Much (You Should Go Find Less)". Strum competed in the second semi-final of Una Voce per San Marino 2025, where she performed the song live. However, she failed to qualify for the final.

On 19 September 2025 she released her third album "Swim" which was preceded by the singles Karma, If You Think I'm Too Much, Everybody, Outgrown and the title track Swim.

== Discography ==
=== Albums ===
- Addicted (Released through Warner Music Group digitally on 1 September 2023, and physically through Back on Wax on 8 May 2026; originally planned for release in 2003 through Warner Bros. Records before being shelved)
- Cocoon (Released through Back on Wax on 6 October 2023; originally planned for release in 2006 through Mercury Records before being shelved, albeit temporary availability on some online music stores before being pulled)
- Swim (Released with Absolute Label Services on 19 September 2025)

=== Singles ===
- "Yesterday (Silence)" (performed with York) (Released on 1 January 2001)
- "Dreaming of You" (performed with The Thrillseekers) (Released on 23 August 2002)
- "Addicted" (Released in 2003)
- "Bad Haircut" (Released on 26 September 2005)
- "It Could Be You" (Released on 13 March 2006)
- "Go My Own Way" (Released on 10 April 2006)
- "I Haven't Got You Anything (This Christmas)" (performed with Bo Pepper) (Released on 12 November 2007)
- "No One but Yourself to Blame" (performed with Bo Pepper) (Released on 23 June 2008)
- "Steppin' on My Toes" (performed with Bo Pepper) (Released on 24 November 2008)
- "Cocoon" (Released on 8 March 2023)
- "Stay Until Summer" (Released on 31 March 2023)
- "Maybe Someday" (Released on 8 April 2023)
- "Padam Padam (Acoustic)" (Released on 9 February 2024)
- "Karma" (Released on 25 October 2024)
- "If You Think I'm Too Much (You Should Go Find Less)" (Released on 7 February 2025)
- "Swim" (Released on 12 May 2025)
- "Everybody" (Released on 18 July 2025)
- "Outgrown" (Released on 5 September 2025)
- "When the Good Goes Bad" (Released on 13 February 2026)

=== Songwriting credits ===
- "Memory" – DuMonde vs. Lange (2001) – with Dominik De Leon, Jürgen Mutschall and Lange
- "Everything" – Sita (2002) – with Ian Bouman and Paul Westcott
- "Still Standing" – Kylie Minogue (2003) – with Ash Thomas
- "Circles" – Cherie (2004) – with Jen Godfrey and Bill Padley
- "Nothing Good About This Goodbye" – Rachel Stevens (2005) – with Brian Higgins and Nick Coler
- "Why Not Us" – Monrose (2008) – with Guy Chambers
