= Leki (singer) =

Belgian singer and TV presenter

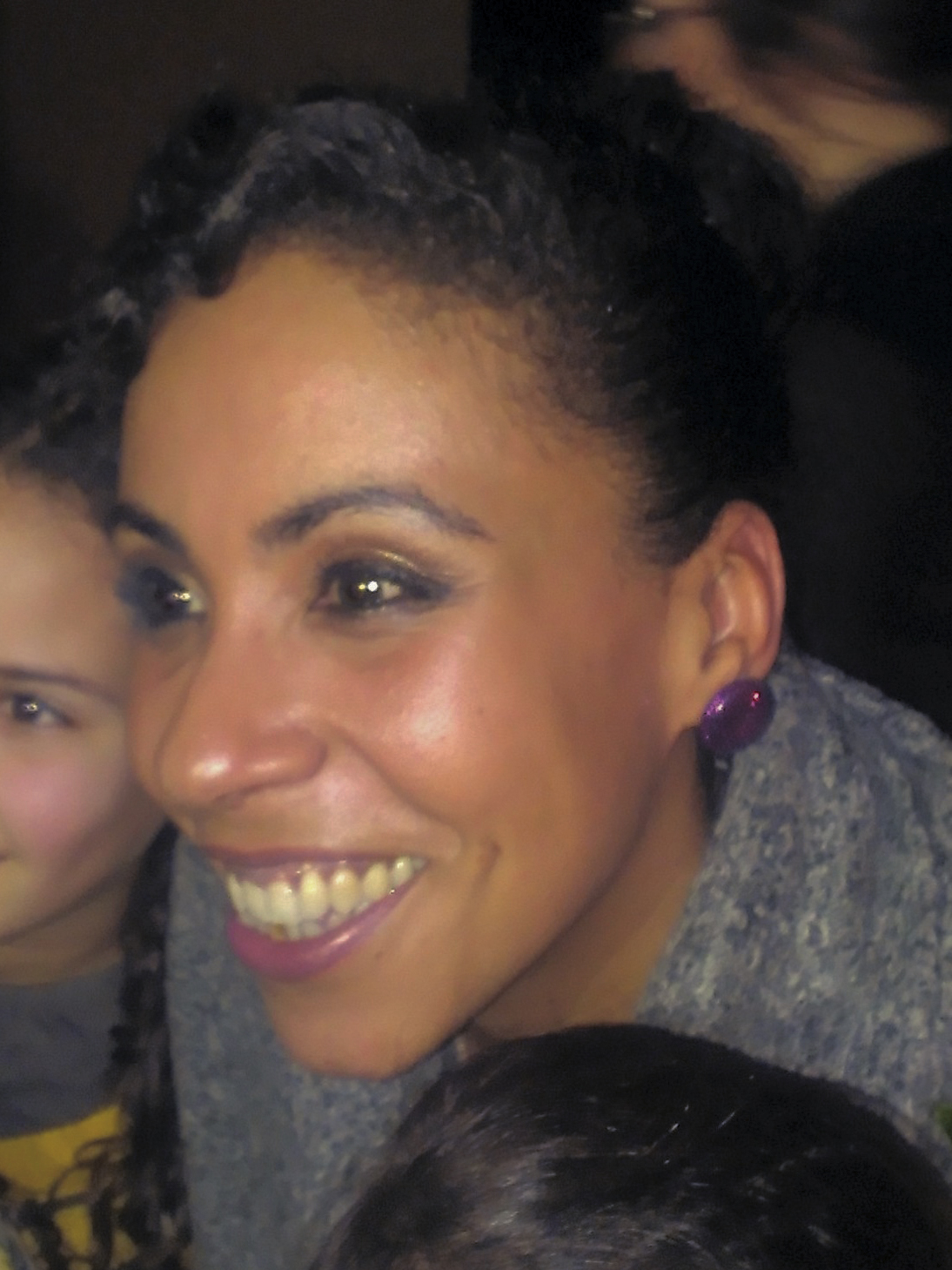

Background information
- Also known as: Leki
- Born: Karoline Kamosi; Kinshasa, Democratic Republic of the Congo
- Genres: Pop, soul, R&B
- Occupations: Singer, songwriter, composer, television presenter
- Instrument: Vocals
- Years active: 2000–present
- Website: Official website

Leki (born 28 January 1978) is a Belgian R&B and pop singer. Her hits include "Breakin' Out", "Spread My Wings", "Over the Rainbow", and "Love Me Another Day". She is also a TV presenter on VTM.

Leki started at the age of twelve recording vocals for Technotronic, where her older sister Ya Kid K was the lead singer.

In October 2009 she released her fourth studio album, "Leki & The Sweet Mints" (Universal Music).

Via Nanda, the non-profit-making organization Leki founded, and under the name "Bouwen aan leven" ("building life") several initiatives - such as the single "Peculiar Places" - have been taken since 2010 to help raise funds, hoping that the hospital will be operational towards the end of 2013.

On 14 May 2012 she released "Get Over", the first single from her 2012 album The Journey.

== Discography ==
=== Albums ===
- 2004 Breakin Out
- 2005 Warrior Girl
- 2008 Multiplicity
- 2009 Leki & The Sweet Mints
- 2012 The Journey

=== Singles ===
Release	Title	Album
2004	"Breakin Out"	Breakin Out
2004	"Crazy"	Breakin Out
2004	"Latin Lover"	Breakin Out
2005	"Warrior Girl"	Warrior Girl
2005	"Spread My Wings"	Warrior Girl
2005	"Trouble"	Warrior Girl
2006	"Sitting in My Car"	Warrior Girl
2008	"Over the Rainbow"	Multiplicity
2008	"Baby" feat. Nile Rodgers	Multiplicity
2009	"Love Me Another Day"	Leki & The Sweet Mints
2009	"Elvis"	Leki & The Sweet Mints
2009	"Obsessive"	Leki & The Sweet Mints
2010	"Peculiar Places"	Leki & The Sweet Mints
2012	"Get Over"	The Journey

== Appears on ==
Release	Artist	Title	Album
2001	Paul Michiels	Daydream	Forever Young
2003	Brahim	How you like it	Music is my life
2005	De Kieppensoep All stars	Kieppensoep voor iedereen	Kieppensoep voor iedereen
2005	Raw Jazz	Throw'm up	Throw'm up
2006	Ali Tcheelab	One Love	One love
2006	Branded X	Let me drive you	Let me drive you
2006	Alien Bitesize	www.Hitthemoneyandrun.com	Alien Bitesize
2007	Felix Da Housecat	Tweak!	Virgo Blaktro and The Movie Disco
2008	Akro	Coupe le verbe en deux	Akro au crunk
2009	Monkey Driven	2015 Theme song	2015 Theme song

== Awards and nominations ==
Year	Nominated work	Award	Result
2004	"Breakin'out"	Best Urban National TMF Awards	Won
2004	"Breakin'out"	Most Promising National Artist TMF Awards	Won
2006	"Trouble"	Best Urban National TMF Awards	Nominated
2008	"Baby with Nile Rodgers"	Best Urban National TMF Awards	Nominated
2008	"Multiplicity"	Best Live Performance La Nuit Du Hip Hop	Won
2009	"Elvis"	Best Urban National TMF Awards	Nominated
