= Jiant =

British production and songwriting team

- Origin: England
- Genres: Pop, dance-pop, pop rock, R&B
- Occupation: Producing
- Years active: 2001-2008
- Members: Tim Hawes; Pete Kirtley; Dave Valler; Tim Hart
- Website: AudiomediaPro.com

Jiant was a British record production and songwriting team, headed by Tim Hawes and Pete Kirtley, working in the genres of pop, R&B and dance. Following their formation in 1999, the team collaborated with other composers and performers, including Alison Clarkson.

In 2002, they received an Ivor Novello Award for their work on "Pure and Simple". The song was recorded and performed by British pop group Hear'Say, and was the fastest-selling UK single of 2001.

== Selected production discography ==
=== 2001 ===
- Hear'Say - "Can't Stop Thinking about That"
- Hear'Say - "Pure and Simple"

=== 2003 ===
- Bro'Sis - "V.I.P."
- Kym Marsh - "After Goodbye"
- No Angels - "No Angel (It's All in Your Mind)"
- No Angels - "So What"

=== 2006 ===
- Joana Zimmer - "What It the Good in Goodbye"
- Monrose - "Do That Dance"
- Monrose - "Live Life Get By"
- Monrose - "Oh La La"
- Monrose - "Shame"
- Sugababes - "Now You're Gone"

=== 2007 ===
- Lisa Bund - "All That I Am"
- Lisa Bund - "In My Head"
- Monrose - "Everybody Makes Mistakes"
- Monrose - "Leading Me on"
- Monrose - "Rebound"
- Monrose - "Strictly Physical"
- Monrose - "What You Don't Know"
- Monrose - "Yesterday's Gone"
- Mutya Buena - Strung Out
- No Angels - "Make a Change"
- No Angels - "Misguided Heart"
- Room2012 - "Chuckoo Brain"
- Room2012 - "Don't Let the Sun"
- Room2012 - "Fresh"
- Room2012 - "Head Bash"
- Room2012 - "Mr. DJ"
- Room2012 - "Naughty but Nice"
- Room2012 - "Simple Things"

=== 2008 ===
- Monrose - "Strike the Match"
- Monrose - "Going out tonight"
