= Risto Asikainen =

Finnish record producer, songwriter and musician

Risto Asikainen (born 20 August 1958, Nurmijärvi) is a Finnish record producer, songwriter and musician. He became known to the general public from the Finnish version of the reality television show "Popstars". In the show he appeared as a judge and also wrote and produced music for the Popstars bands.

In Finland, Asikainen has worked behind numerous successful pop-artists and bands, such as Nylon Beat, S.E.S., Kaija Koo, Dingo, Arja Koriseva, Kari Tapio, Gimmel and Robin.

Asikainen is signed as a writer to Elements Music.
