= Obi Mhondera =

Obi Simbarashe Mhondera (born May 21, 1980, in Mutare, Zimbabwe) is a songwriter, producer and re-mixer responsible for many major releases worldwide, particularly in the United Kingdom, Europe and Asia.

== Background ==
He was born and raised in Zimbabwe before moving to the United Kingdom. His first hit record was "Flip Reverse" which reached no. 2 in the UK Singles Chart. He since has worked with Sugababes, Blue, RBD, Boa, Dream, Jeremy Greene, Tata Young, Blazin' Squad, Billie Piper, Mutya Buena, Monrose, Room 2012, Queensberry, Cinema Bizarre, Jimi Blue and Jeanette Bierderman.

== Madeleine McCann ==
Mhondera remixed the single "Missing (Where Are You?)", a song to aid Missing People in remembrance of Madeleine McCann.

== Song Writing/ Production/ Credits ==
- Cinema Bizarre " Modern Lover" Toyz
- Cinema Bizarre " In Your Cage" Toyz
- Cinema Bizarre " Blasphemy" Toyz
- Tata Young "Suffocate"
- KayCeeDee "Bad Boy"
- Blue
- The Saturdays
- Aggro Santos
- Sef "Need a Hero"
- Sef "Outta Da Ghetto"
- Mutya Buena " Strung Out "
- Chloe Wang "HeartBeat"
- Shinee
- Monrose (Strictly Physical) " Strictly Physical"
- Monrose (Temptation) "Ooh la la"
- Monrose (Temptation) "Do That Dance"
- Monrose (I AM "Going Out Tonite"
- Room 2012 (8 songs on Album)
- Kelley Key
- Queensberry Volume 1 "Bike"
- Queensberry Volume 1 "Sprung"
- Fady Maalouf " Fire"
- Tommy Reeve "Crying"
- KAT-TUN
- TVXQ
- Culture Beat "The way you Move"
- Jaoanna Zimmer "In My Head"
- Sarah Connor
- Lisa Maffia
- Smuji
- Blazin' Squad " FLIP REVERSE"
- Jimi Blue "Do the ya"
- Jimi Blue "In Da Club"
- Blazin' Squad "Here for One"
- Clea "Stuck In The Middle"
- Clea " Sprung"
- Nathan Nfg " Come Into My Room"
- Nathan Nfg " Round and Round"
- Triple 8 "Hit Da Bone"

=== Remixes Include ===
- Christina Aguilera "Hurt"
- Natasha Bedingfield "Wanna Have your Babies"
- John Legend "Save Room"
- Blue "If you Come Back"
- 3LW "Do Me Right"
- 3LW "Playas are gon Play"
- Jagged Edge "Where The Party At"
