= Bahar Kizil =

German singer

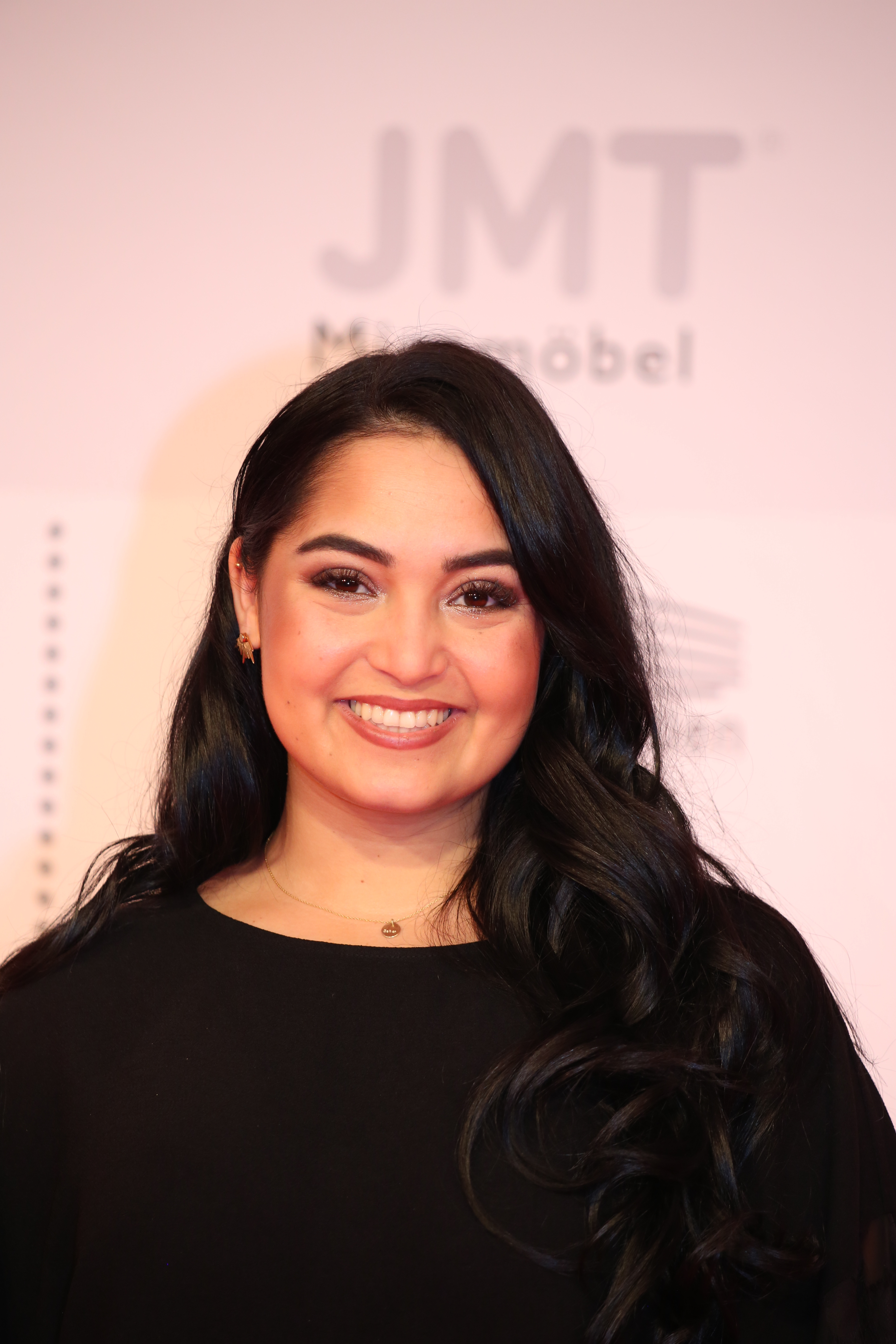
- Kizil in 2017

Background information
- Also known as: Bahar
- Born: 5 October 1988 (age 37); Freiburg, West Germany
- Genres: Pop; dance-pop; R&B
- Occupations: Singer; songwriter
- Years active: 2006–present
- Labels: Starwatch; HMG Music; Membran Media; recordJet; tkbz media

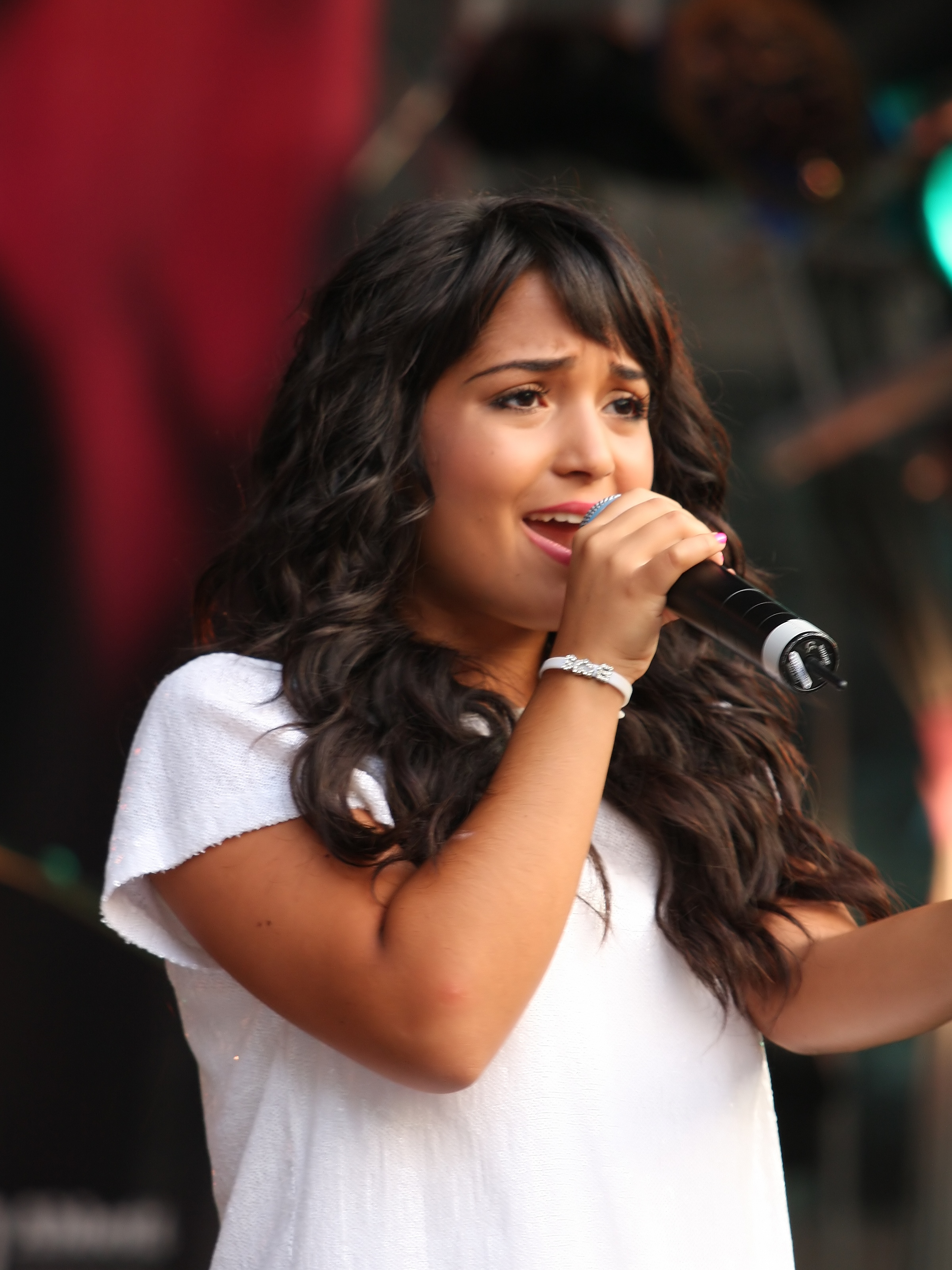
Kizil in 2009

Bahar Kizil (Turkish: Bahar Kızıl; born 5 October 1988) is a German singer and songwriter of Turkish descent, best known as one of the founding members of the girl group Monrose, which won the fifth season of the German version of Popstars.

== Early life ==
Born in Freiburg, Baden-Württemberg, Kizil is from a Turkish family from Bayburt, and her first name, Bahar, means "spring" (the season) in Turkish. At age 12, she started with ballet. In her town, she sang with four different bands prior to the Popstars casting.

== Career ==
Kizil is one of the three winners of the fifth German Popstars season and was a member of the resulting group Monrose, together with Senna Gammour and Mandy Capristo. After their break-up in 2011, she started her solo-career in 2013 and premiered with her song "Drank" featuring SpaceBoyz. In the same year, her song "Medusa" featuring Nitro came out. In 2015, she released her debut album Bullets of Love, which did not peaked the Official Charts. In 2017, she participated on the German dance show Dance Dance Dance and teamed up with No Angels singer Sandy Mölling.

After a long music break, Kizil came back in 2019 as a lead vocalist in the pop group Traumfrequenz. In the same year, she released her solo songs "What Eyes Cannot See" and "C'est ma vie". In 2020, she decided to sing in German and released the songs "Die Fremde", "Blaue Stunde", and "NOS" on YouTube and Spotify. She is currently working on her second album.

== Discography ==
=== Studio albums ===
Title	Album details	Peak chart positions		
Title	Album details	GER	AUT	SWI
Bullets of Love	Released: 30 January 2015; Label: Membran Media GmbH; Formats: CD, digital download, streaming	—	—	—

=== Compilation ===
Title	Album details	Peak chart positions		
Title	Album details	GER	AUT	SWI
Die 10 Gebote (Musical by Dieter Falk, Michael Künzel)	Released: 1 September 2009; Label: Gerth Medien GmbH; Formats: CD, digital download, streaming	—	—	—

=== Singles ===
==== As solo artist ====
List of singles, with selected chart positions and certifications
Title	Year	Peak chart positions				Album
Title	Year	GER	GER BC	AUT	SWI	Album
"Memories" (feat. Cristóbal Gálvez Moreno)	2009	—	—	—	—	Memories (CD single)
"Drank" (feat. SpaceBoyz)	2013	—	3	—	—	Bullets of Love
"Medusa" (feat. Nitro)	2013	—	—	—	—	Bullets of Love
"Love Bullet"	2014	—	—	—	—	Bullets of Love
"Gossip Bitch"	2014	—	11	—	—	Bullets of Love
"Revo"	2014	—	—	—	—	Bullets of Love
"Bulletproof"	2015	—	—	—	—	Bullets of Love
"What Eyes Cannot See"	2019	—	—	—	—	Non-album singles
"C'est Ma Vie"	2019	—	—	—	—	Non-album singles
"Die Fremde"	2020	—	—	—	—	Non-album singles
"Blaue Stunde"	2020	—	—	—	—	Non-album singles
"NOS"	2020	—	—	—	—	Non-album singles
"Flieder"	2021	—	—	—	—	Non-album singles
"Genug"	2021	—	—	—	—	Non-album singles
"Zaman"	2021	—	—	—	—	Non-album singles
"—" denotes a title that was not released or did not chart in that territory.

=== With Traumfrequenz ===
Title	Year	Peak chart positions			Album
Title	Year	GER	AUT	SWI	Album
"Ohne dich"	2019	—	—	—	Non-album singles
"Hunderttausend"	2019	—	—	—	Non-album singles
"Mon chéri"	2019	—	—	—	Non-album singles
"—" denotes a title that was not released or did not chart in that territory.

=== Other appearances ===
Year	Song	Album
2011	"Daheim"	Non-album single
2011	"Königinnen"	Hanni und Nanni 2: Original Soundtrack
2012	"Marching Over You"	Non-album single
2016	"Ist dein kleines Herz noch für mich frei?" (with Whiskydenker)	Wir bleiben hier

== Filmography ==
=== Television ===
Year	Title	Role	Notes
2013	Promi Shopping Queen	Herself	Participant; 1 episode
2017	Dance Dance Dance	Herself	Participant
