= Pete Kirtley =

English musician (born 1972)

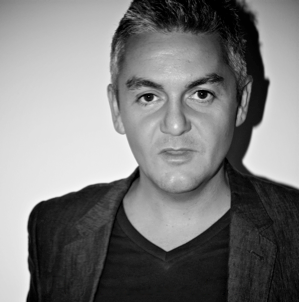

Background information
- Born: Peter Edward Kirtley; 14 April 1972 (age 54)
- Origin: Cuckfield, Sussex, England
- Genres: Pop, dance-pop, pop rock
- Occupations: Songwriter, producer, music entrepreneur

Peter Edward Kirtley (born 14 April 1972) is an English songwriter, record producer and music entrepreneur. He has produced over 200 records worldwide with sales exceeding 15 million and 100 million streams, including seven number-one hit singles worldwide, tracks on seven number-one albums, eight UK top-ten hits and thirty-five top-forty hits in Europe. He has written and/or produced for artists such as Tiësto, the Sugababes, Armin Van Buuren, Hear'Say, Newton Faulkner, Mutya Buena, Boyzone, Peter Andre, Lee Ryan, Heather Small, Kim Wilde and Alexander O'Neal. His production collaborations include Ryan Tedder, Guy Chambers and Stargate and metaverse music collaborations include Izzy Bizu and Nina Nesbitt.

Kirtley has won an Ivor Novello Award and been nominated for a Brit Award.

== Early life and career ==
Peter Edward Kirtley was born in Cuckfield, Sussex, England, but moved to Surrey at a young age. The younger of two children, his father, Al Kirtley, was a semi-professional musician who had at one time been a member of Zoot Money's Big Roll Band and later of Trendsetters Limited, and under contract to Parlophone Records.

At the age of 11 Kirtley joined a band with Matt Goss, Luke Goss and Craig Logan who later formed the British band Bros. Kirtley was a keen amateur actor while at school, but at the age of 16 chose music as a career and became a professional drummer. For four years he was a member of The Blue, a band managed by Bob Herbert and his son Chris, the original managers of the Spice Girls. The Blue's only single, "Don't Leave Me Standing in the Pouring Rain", was released in 1992, but failed to enter the chart.

== Songwriting and record production ==
Although Kirtley had written songs from an early age his successful writing and production career effectively began with music for television commercials, including commissions by Saatchi and Saatchi. These were followed by tracks on a number of international albums, including the 1998 album, "Privacy", by Ophelie Winter. In 1999 he teamed up with Tim Hawes to form the writing and production team Jiant and, in the following year, they secured a track on Aaron Carter's three million selling double multi-platinum album Aaron's Party (Come Get It), two tracks on Boyzone member Stephen Gately's solo project, as well as song placements with acts in Japan, France, Denmark and South Africa.

In early 2001, Jiant reached the final of A Song for Europe, but this was almost immediately overshadowed by the release of "Pure and Simple", co-written with Alison Clarkson and recorded by Hear'Say, the winners of the ITV talent show, Popstars. "Pure and Simple" was at the time the fastest selling debut single of all time in the UK, selling just under 550,000 copies in the first week. In total more than 1.2 million copies were sold, and it was one of the few singles to achieve double platinum status in that decade. In 2002, Kirtley and his co-writers received an Ivor Novello Award for the best selling UK single of 2001. On 7 May 2012, BBC Radio 1 featured the official top 150 biggest selling singles of the 21st century and placed "Pure and Simple" at number 17. The song also topped the New Zealand Singles Chart for five weeks.

Kirtley continued to enjoy chart success, achieving his second number one single in the UK with the Jiant/Stargate co-production of Hear'Say's, "The Way to Your Love". His third number one single was "No Angel (It's All in Your Mind)", recorded by the German band No Angels. Kirtley's fourth number one, "Shame", the debut single of Monrose, became the fastest-selling German CD single of 2006, and the biggest-downloaded song since the introduction of the legal digital download charts in Germany in 2004. It also reached number one in Austria and Switzerland. For a number of years Kirtley worked closely with the German TV series of Popstars and produced more than 50 records for the winning acts from the show, including 35 tracks with girlband Monrose and other Popstars winners such as Queensberry, Room 2012 and Some & Any. Kirtley also worked with the German acts Linda Teodosiu, Zascha Moktan and Joana Zimmer. Kim Wilde's album, Come Out and Play, also featured Kirtley's work and reached the top 10 in Germany.

Further chart success has included songs on Sugababes number one album Taller in More Ways, Mutya Buena's debut solo album Real Girl, which reached the UK top ten chart, America's Got Talent winner Bianca Ryan's self-titled debut album, plus the Armin van Buuren and Rank 1 single "This World Is Watching Me". One of Kirtley's songs was featured on Koda Kumi's tenth studio album, Japonesque ("No Man's Land"), which reached number one in Japan, and "Light Years Away" was a single and featured on the Tiësto album, A Town Called Paradise, which reached number two in the Billboard Dance/Electronic Albums chart. His production of a solo version by Stephen Gately of Dream, was included by Boyzone in their album Thank You & Goodnight with Gately's vocals being incorporated in the album version.

Kirtley also co-wrote and produced (under the pseudonym of The Cheeky Boyz) the Cheeky Song (Touch My Bum), the first single of The Cheeky Girls, which sold more than 1.2 million units internationally. He also co-wrote and produced the following three singles, all of which reached the top ten of the UK charts.

He is a member of the Executive Committee of the charity Rugby for Heroes, and co-wrote and produced "With Pride", their official anthem for the Rugby World Cup.

In 2017, he was invited to take part in the 30th anniversary Bros concert at London's O2 Arena and was featured on percussion.

In July 2021, Kirtley launched his first virtual artificial intelligence driven act, Skullz under a new label venture, Soundr, set up by Kirtley. The metaverse music label aims to develop and release virtual artists who will exist exclusively in virtual worlds. Skullz, originally destined to be a real-world act created by Kirtley in 2019, became digital after Kirtley witnessed how the gaming industry survived through the COVID-19 pandemic via digital experiences and transactions.

== Other media ==
In 2011, Kirtley joined with Craig Logan, former manager of Pink and ex-Managing Director of the RCA Label Group to work on his first TV format. They entered into a commercial agreement with FremantleMedia in July 2012.

Kirtley was the producer of The School That Rocks, a documentary broadcast on BBC Three in March 2014.

In 2020, Kirtley produced the feature film Caged starring Edi Gathegi, which was nominated for Best Feature Film and won Best Director at the Pasadena International Film Festival that year.
