= Stefanie Heinzmann discography =

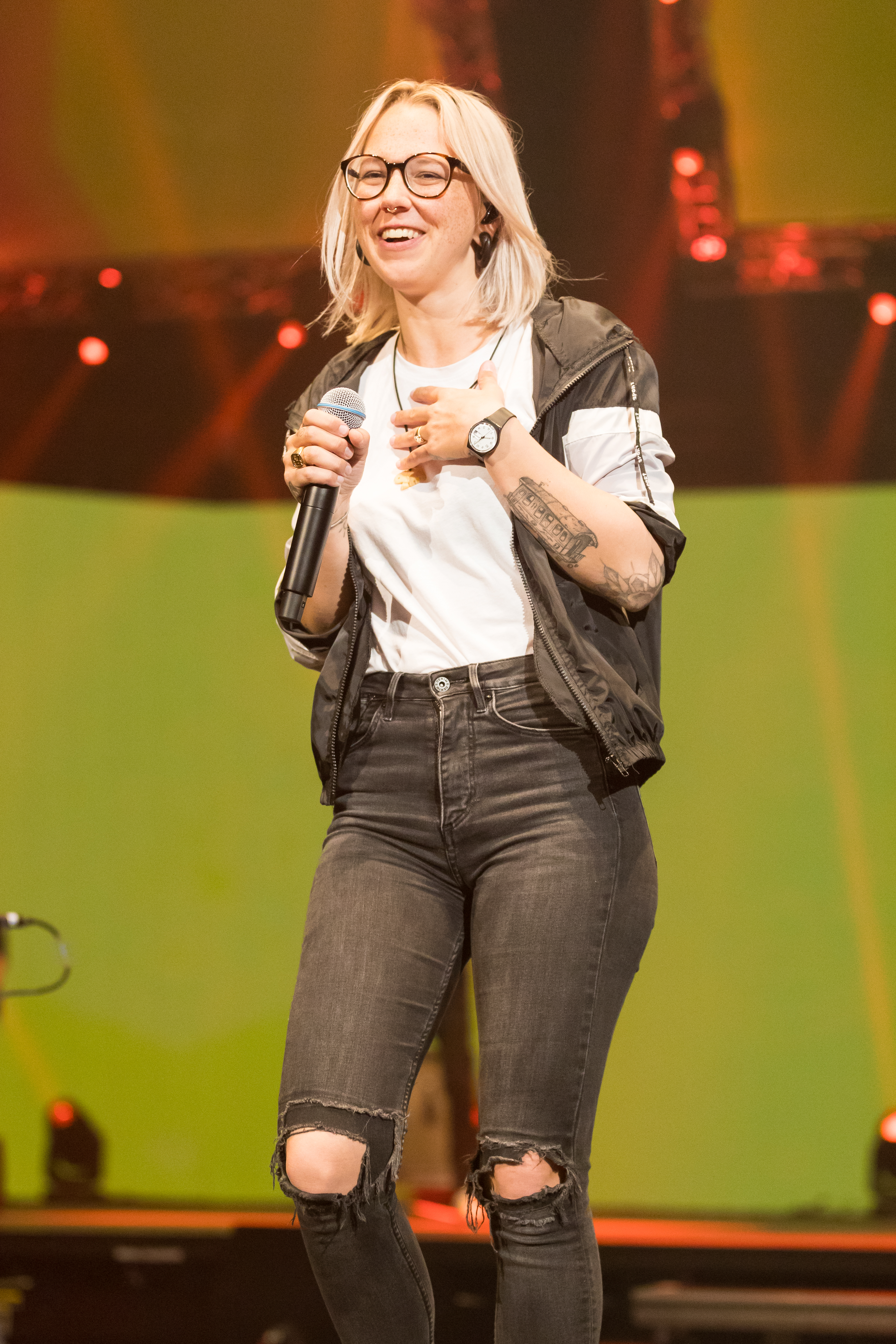
- Heinzmann at the 30 Jahre Radio Regenbogen in Mannheim in 2018.
- Studio albums: 7
- Singles: 26

Swiss singer Stefanie Heinzmann has released seven studio albums and 18 singles as a lead artist. In 2008, Heinzmann won SSDSDSSWEMUGABRTLAD, a talent contest hosted in TV total on the German ProSieben network, and was subsequently offered a recording contract with Universal Music Domestic. Her coronation song "My Man Is a Mean Man" debuted straight on top of the Swiss Singles Chart and reached the top ten in Austria and Germany. Heinzmann's debut album Masterplan was released in March 2008. It made it to the top ten in Austria and Germany and also debuted atop the album charts in Switzerland, where it was certified platinum by the IFPI for sales in excess of 30,000 copies. The album was reissued the same year and followed by her second album Roots to Grow in September 2009. Albeit less successful commercially, it peaked at number four on the Swiss Albums Chart and made it to the top twenty in Germany. Leading single "No One (Can Ever Change My Mind)" reached the top thirty of the Swiss Singles Chart, while third single "Roots to Grow" became at top twenty hit in Germany.

Following a longer hiatus, Heinzmann released her self-titled third album in 2012. The album's first offering, "Diggin' in the Dirt" reached number six in Switzerland as well as the top twenty and top thirty in Germany and Switzerland respectively, marking her highest-charting single since "My Man Is a Mean Man". Equally successful, Stefanie Heinzmann became a top ten success in both Switzerland and Germany. Heinzmann's fourth album Chance of Rain was released in March 2015 and became her fourth consecutive album to reach the top five in Switzerland. It produced the top ten hit "In the End". In September 2018, Heinzmann released the single "Build a House," a collaboration with German DJ and producer Alle Farben. It reached the top forty of the Swiss Singles Chart and preceded her fifth studio album All We Need Is Love, released in March 2019 through BMG Rights Management. It became her first album to top the Swiss Albums Chart since her 2008 debut album Masterplan. The album produced three singles, including lead single "Mother's Heart" and follow-up "Shadows," all of which failed to chart but received radio airplay. Labyrinth, her second album with BMG, was released in May 2021 and became her sixth consecutive top five entry on the Swiss Albums Chart.

== Albums ==
List of albums, with selected chart positions, and certifications
Title	Album details	Peak chart positions			Certifications
Title	Album details	SWI	AUT	GER	Certifications
Masterplan	Released: 7 March 2008; Label: Universal Music; Formats: CD, download	1	5	3	SWI: Platinum; GER: Platinum
Roots to Grow	Released: 11 September 2009; Label: Universal Music; Formats: CD, download	4	41	13	
Stefanie Heinzmann	Release date: 16 March 2012; Label: Universal Music; Formats: CD, download	3	24	8	
Chance of Rain	Release date: 27 March 2015; Label: Universal Music; Formats: CD, download	4	—	20	
All We Need Is Love	Release date: 22 March 2019; Label: BMG Rights Management; Formats: CD, download	1	—	18	
Labyrinth	Release date: 14 May 2021; Label: BMG Rights Management; Formats: CD, download	4	—	19	
Circles	Release date: 10 October 2025; Label: Seven.One Starwatch; Formats: CD, download	10	—	22	

== Singles ==
List of singles, with selected chart positions and certifications, showing year released and album name
Title	Year	Peak chart positions			Certifications	Album
Title	Year	SWI	AUT	GER	Certifications	Album
"My Man Is a Mean Man"	2008	1	6	3	GER: Gold	Masterplan
"Like a Bullet"	2008	27	53	29		Masterplan
"Revolution"	2008	75	—	47		Masterplan
"The Unforgiven"	2008	20	30	10		Masterplan
"No One (Can Ever Change My Mind)"	2009	27	71	36		Roots to Grow
"Unbreakable"/"Stop"	2009	—	—	68		Roots to Grow
"Roots to Grow" (featuring Gentleman)	2010	56	61	16		Roots to Grow
"Diggin' in the Dirt"	2012	6	29	12	GER: Gold; SWI: Platinum	Stefanie Heinzmann
"Show Me the Way"	2012	—	—	—		Stefanie Heinzmann
"Fire"	2012	53	—	—		Stefanie Heinzmann
"In the End"	2015	9	67	25		Chance of Rain
"On Fire"	2015	40	—	— (Note: "On Fire" did not appear on the official German Singles Chart, but peaked at number 19 on the German Airplay Chart.)		Chance of Rain
"Stranger in This World"	2015	—	—	— (Note: "Stranger in This World" did not appear on the official German Singles Chart, but peaked at number 35 on the German Airplay Chart.)		Chance of Rain
"Build a House" (featuring Alle Farben)	2018	38	— (Note: "Build a House" did not appear on the official Austrian Singles Chart, but peaked at number 15 on the Austrian Airplay Chart.)	— (Note: "Build a House" did not appear on the official German Singles Chart, but peaked at number 8 on the German Airplay Chart.)		All We Need Is Love
"Mother's Heart"	2019	— (Note: "Mother's Heart" did not appear on the official Swiss Singles Chart, but peaked at number 16 on the Swiss Airplay Chart.)	—	— (Note: "Mother's Heart" did not appear on the official German Singles Chart, but peaked at number 25 on the German Airplay Chart.)		All We Need Is Love
"Shadows"	2019	—	—	— (Note: "Mother's Heart" did not appear on the official German Singles Chart, but peaked at number 8 on the German Airplay Chart.)		All We Need Is Love
"All We Need Is Love" (featuring Jake Isaac)	2020	— (Note: "All We Need Is Love" did not appear on the official Swiss Singles Chart, but peaked at number 18 on the Swiss Airplay Chart.)	—	— (Note: "All We Need Is Love" did not appear on the official German Singles Chart, but peaked at number 19 on the German Airplay Chart.)		All We Need Is Love
"Colors"	2020	— (Note: "Colors" did not appear on the official Swiss Singles Chart, but peaked at number 7 on the Swiss Airplay Chart.)	—	— (Note: "Colors" did not appear on the official German Singles Chart, but peaked at number 35 on the German Airplay Chart.)		Labyrinth
"Would You Still Love Me"	2021	— (Note: "Would You Still Love Me" did not appear on the official Swiss Singles Chart, but peaked at number 23 on the Swiss Airplay Chart.)	—	—		Labyrinth
"Best Life"	2021	—	—	—		Labyrinth
"Believe"	2021	—	—	—		Labyrinth
"Just Like I Love You" (with Stress)	2022	— (Note: "Just Like I Love You" did not appear on the official Swiss Singles Chart, but peaked at number 10 on the Swiss Airplay Chart.)	—	—		Non-album singles
"Come On Over"	2022	—	—	—		Non-album singles
"Carry the World"	2022	— (Note: "Carry the World" did not appear on the official Swiss Singles Chart, but peaked at number 9 on the Swiss Airplay Chart.)	—	—		Non-album singles
"Power"	2025	— (Note: "Power" did not appear on the official Swiss Singles Chart, but peaked at number 18 on the Swiss Airplay Chart.)	—	— (Note: "Power" did not appear on the official German Singles Chart, but peaked at number 39 on the German Airplay Chart.)		Circles
"Good"	2025	— (Note: "Good" did not appear on the official Swiss Singles Chart, but peaked at number 13 on the Swiss Airplay Chart.)	—	— (Note: "Good" did not appear on the official German Singles Chart, but peaked at number 26 on the German Airplay Chart.)		Circles

== Other charted songs ==
List of other charted songs, with selected chart positions, showing year released and album name
Title	Year	Peak chart positions	Album
Title	Year	SWI	Album
"Heimweh"	2020	78	Sing meinen Song – Das Schweizer Tauschkonzert

== Appearances ==
Song	Year	Artist(s)	Album
"XTAL"	2007	SHIVA, Stefanie Heinzmann	Meaning Defeat Machine
"Ich keere Dich, Laura Montani"	2008	Stefanie Heinzmann	Gitsderschi?
"Since You've Been Gone"	2009	Tower of Power, Stefanie Heinzmann	Great American Soulbook
"Work It Hard"	2009	Stress, Stefanie Heinzmann	Evolution
"It's Love"	2010	Heavytones, Stefanie Heinzmann	Freaks of Nature
"Dancing on the Ceiling"	2012	Lionel Richie, Rascal Flatts, Stefanie Heinzmann	Tuskegee
"Lost"	2013	Seven, Stefanie Heinzmann	The Art is Piano
"Ich zwingu di nit"	2013	Sina, Stefanie Heinzmann	Duette
"Schlaf siäss, chleis Mämmi"	2013	Sina, Stefanie Heinzmann	Duette
"Unter dem Meer"	2014	Stefanie Heinzmann	Giraffenaffen 3
"Can You Feel the Love Tonight"	2014	Stefanie Heinzmann	I Love Disney
"Proud Mary"	2014	Andreas Gabalier, Stefanie Heinzmann	Home Sweet Home
"We Are One"	2014	Angie Ott, Stefanie Heinzmann	Every Second
"World of Distortion"	2015	Jason Mann, Stefanie Heinzmann	Dein Song 2015
"Plain Sailing"	2015	Rea Garvey, Stefanie Heinzmann	Prisma
"Father and Son"	2015	Shem Thomas, Stefanie Heinzmann	You're (Not) the Only One
"Alperose"	2015	Büne Huber, Jaël, Knackeboul, Sina, Stefanie Heinzmann	100% Schweizer Musik
"Kiosk"	2015	Stefanie Heinzmann	100% Schweizer Musik
"In the End"	2015	Gregor Meyle, Stefanie Heinzmann	Meylensteine
"My Man Is a Mean Man"	2015	Gregor Meyle, Stefanie Heinzmann	Meylensteine
"The Unforgiven"	2015	Gregor Meyle, Stefanie Heinzmann	Meylensteine
"Ich brech' die Herzen der stolzesten Frauen"	2016	Udo Lindenberg, Till Brönner, Stefanie Heinzmann	Stärker als die Zeit – Live
"Hasta el amanecer"	2020	Stefanie Heinzmann	Singen meinen Song – Das Schweizer Tauschkonzert
"Heimweh"	2020	Stefanie Heinzmann	Singen meinen Song – Das Schweizer Tauschkonzert
"Holunder"	2020	Stefanie Heinzmann	Singen meinen Song – Das Schweizer Tauschkonzert
"Lisa"	2020	Stefanie Heinzmann	Singen meinen Song – Das Schweizer Tauschkonzert
"Üses Läbe"	2020	Stefanie Heinzmann	Singen meinen Song – Das Schweizer Tauschkonzert
"You Can't Stop the Rainfall"	2020	Stefanie Heinzmann	Singen meinen Song – Das Schweizer Tauschkonzert

== Music videos ==
Title	Year	Director(s)
"My Man Is a Mean Man"	2008	Frank Husmann
"Like a Bullet"	2008	Sharon Berkal
"Revolution"	2008	Sandra Marschner
"The Unforgiven"	2008	Sandra Marschner
"No One (Can Ever Change My Mind)"	2009	Sandra Marschner
"Unbreakable"	2009	Sandra Marschner
"Stop"	2009	Sandra Marschner
"Roots to Grow"	2010	Sandra Marschner
"Diggin' in the Dirt"	2012	Sandra Marschner
"Show Me the Way"	2012	Ben Rollason
"Stranger in This World"	2015	Nikolai Kampen
"In the End"	2015	Sergej Moya
"On Fire"	2015	Sergej Moya
"Build a House"	2018	Oliver Sommer
"Mother's Heart"	2019	Kristin Herziger
"Shadows"	2019	C. Yuhki Oka
"All We Need Is Love"	2020	C. Yuhki Oka
"Colors"	2020	C. Yuhki Oka
"Would You Still Love Me"	2021	Patrick Wulf
"Carry the World"	2022	Unknown
"Power"	2025	Mikis Fontagnier, Jan Mroczkowski
"Good"	2025	Mikis Fontagnier, Jan Mroczkowski
