= Give Me the Music =

Studio album by Eva Avila
- Released: October 28, 2008
- Length: 42:51
- Label: Sony BMG Canada
- Producer: Matt Wallace

Eva Avila chronology
| Somewhere Else (2006) | Give Me the Music (2008) |

Give Me the Music is the second studio album by Canadian singer Eva Avila, the winner of the fourth season of Canadian Idol. It was released in Canada on October 28, 2008.

== Critical reception ==
Professional ratings
Review scores
| Source | Rating |
|---|---|
| AllMusic | 3.5/5 stars |

AllMusic editor Matthew Chisling rated the album three and a half out of five stars. He found that Give Me the Music was "the first real example of how exciting Avila is as a pop revelation; her beyond impressive vocal capacity is glorified on this bouncing beat, not hindered like many of her contemporaries [...] Give Me the Music is hardly a bad album, and Avila sounds nearly as wonderfully delicious as she did when her fan base first grew to love her on Canadian Idol [...] This album is one large step towards putting Avila on the pop map where she rightfully belongs."

== Track listing ==
Give Me the Music track listing
| No. | Title | Writer(s) | Length |
|---|---|---|---|
| 1. | "No Smoke" | Alan Ross; David James; John McLaughlin | 3:08 |
| 2. | "Wait" | Crispin Hunt; Jade Ewen | 3:04 |
| 3. | "Run" | Eva Avila; Adam Crossley; Asher Lenz | 3:45 |
| 4. | "Damned" | Greg Johnston; Luke McMaster; Sherry St. Germain; Scott Jacoby | 3:48 |
| 5. | "Give Me the Music" | Scott Carter; Damon Hayes; Frankie Storm; Tee Marie; Shawn Johnson | 3:17 |
| 6. | "No More Coming Back" | Liz Rodrigues | 3:48 |
| 7. | "What I Want (Not What I Need)" | Adam Messinger; Rodrigues | 3:57 |
| 8. | "Like a Bullet" | Niara Scarlett; Henrik Korpi; Jens Bergmark; Henrik Franzén | 3:07 |
| 9. | "You Don't Say No" | Martin Sutton; Chris Neil; Don Mescall | 3:51 |
| 10. | "Master Plan" | James Manners; Hannah Robinson; Silje Haugum Nymoen | 3:38 |
| 11. | "Say Goodbye" | Messinger; Nasri Atweh | 3:22 |
| 12. | "I'm Sorry" | Audra Mae; Johan Fransson; Tobias Lundgren; Tim Larsson | 4:06 |
| Total length: | | | 42:56 |

iTunes bonus track
| No. | Title | Writer(s) | Length |
|---|---|---|---|
| 13. | "My Neighbourhood" | Audra Mae; Johan Fransson; Tobias Lundgren; Tim Larsson | 3:42 |

=== Covers ===
1. "Like a Bullet" and "Master Plan" are cover songs, originally released by Stefanie Heinzmann from Switzerland. Both songs appeared on her debut album Masterplan, with "Like a Bullet" having been the second single released from the album.
2. "No Smoke" was originally recorded in 2004 by British singer Michelle Lawson. The song was first covered by Belgian singer Esther Sels in 2008, then called "Game Over." Esther performed it in the second heat of Belgium's Eurosong in 2009. It's also been covered by the German band Queensberry and released as their debut clip following their success on German Popstars in 2008 and Nicki French is too releasing a version of the song on Energise Records in 2009.

== Singles ==
- "Give Me the Music" (September 2008) Produced by Dame & Scott of The Matrax
- "Damned" (November 2008)
- "No More Coming Back" (April 2009)
- "No Smoke" (September 2009)

== Charts ==
Weekly chart performance for Give Me the Music
| Chart (2008) | Peak position |
|---|---|
| Canadian Album (Billboard) | 63 |
