= Kaetlyn Osmond =

Canadian figure skater

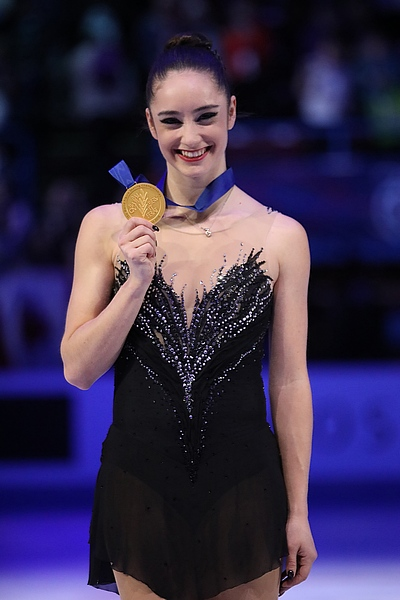
- Osmond at the 2018 World Figure Skating Championships

Personal information
- Born: December 5, 1995 (age 30) Marystown, Newfoundland, Canada
- Height: 1.65 m (5 ft 5 in)

Figure skating career
- Country: Canada
- Began skating: 1998
- Retired: May 2, 2019

Medal record
Event	Gold medal – first place	Silver medal – second place	Bronze medal – third place
Olympic Games	1	1	1
World Championships	1	1	0
Grand Prix Final	0	0	1
Canadian Championships	3	1	2
World Team Trophy	0	1	0
Medal list
Olympic Games
Gold medal – first place	2018 Pyeongchang	Team
Silver medal – second place	2014 Sochi	Team
Bronze medal – third place	2018 Pyeongchang	Singles
World Championships
Gold medal – first place	2018 Milan	Singles
Silver medal – second place	2017 Helsinki	Singles
Grand Prix Final
Bronze medal – third place	2017–18 Nagoya	Singles
Canadian Championships
Gold medal – first place	2013 Mississauga	Singles
Gold medal – first place	2014 Ottawa	Singles
Gold medal – first place	2017 Ottawa	Singles
Silver medal – second place	2018 Vancouver	Singles
Bronze medal – third place	2012 Moncton	Singles
Bronze medal – third place	2016 Halifax	Singles
World Team Trophy
Silver medal – second place	2013 Tokyo	Team

Kaetlyn Osmond ONL (born December 5, 1995) is a retired Canadian figure skater. She is the 2018 Olympic bronze medalist, the 2018 World champion, the 2017 World silver medalist, the 2017 Grand Prix Final bronze medalist, a three-time Canadian national champion (2013, 2014, 2017), a 2018 Olympic team event gold medalist, and a 2014 Winter Olympics team event silver medalist.

One of her country's most successful women's skaters, she was Canada's sixth Olympic ladies' medallist and its first ladies' World champion in 45 years. As of 2026, Osmond is the last Canadian woman figure skater to medal individually at the Olympics.

== Personal life ==
Osmond was born in Marystown, Newfoundland, to Jeff and Jackie Osmond. At age seven, she moved to Montreal, Quebec, and at age ten, she moved to Sherwood Park, Alberta Osmond attended Vimy Ridge Academy in Edmonton. She has two older siblings. In April 2014, Marystown renamed their home rink the Kaetlyn Osmond Arena, named a street after her, and presented her with a symbolic key to the town. Osmond noted that her favourite Olympic memory was watching Joannie Rochette win bronze at the 2010 Winter Olympics and Rochette served as a role model to her in the sport.

On January 29, 2019, Osmond received the Order of Newfoundland and Labrador, her home province's top civilian honour for "excellence and achievement."

== Career ==
Osmond began skating at age three, following her elder sister Natasha. Due to a lack of ice during the summer in Marystown, they often travelled to Montreal to train. Since the age of ten, after her parents came west because of work in the oil industry Osmond trained at the Ice Palace Figure Skating Club in Edmonton, coached by Ravi Walia with choreography by Lance Vipond.

=== 2011–12 season: National bronze medal ===
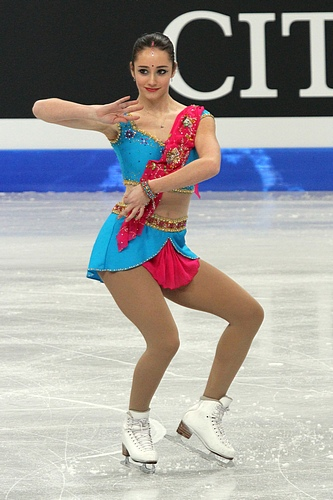
Osmond at the 2012 World Junior Championships.

In the 2011–12 season, Osmond competed on the senior level for the first time at the Canadian Championships. She was first after the short program, ahead of the defending champion Cynthia Phaneuf and the 2011 bronze medallist Amelie Lacoste. Osmond won the bronze medal overall. At the 2012 World Junior Championships, Osmond won the preliminary round. She finished tenth overall.

=== 2012–13 season: First international and national titles ===
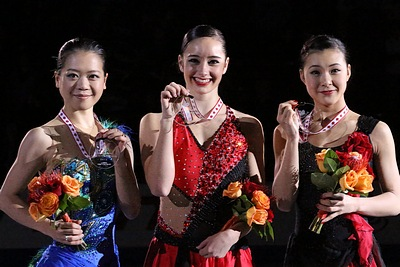
Osmond (centre) with Akiko Suzuki (left) and Kanako Murakami (right) on the podium at the 2012 Skate Canada International

In the 2012–13 season, Osmond won her first international title at 2012 Nebelhorn Trophy. She then made her senior Grand Prix debut at the 2012 Skate Canada International. She was second in both the short and free programs, but it was enough to win the competition. Osmond remarked that "On the Junior Grand Prix, I was always ninth or 10th, so this is just extraordinary." Despite winning Skate Canada, Osmond was unable to qualify for that season's Grand Prix Final because she had not been given a second Grand Prix assignment.

Osmond went on to win her first senior national title at the 2013 Canadian Championships. It was the first time in ten years that a ladies' single skater from outside Quebec won the Canadian title. At the 2013 Four Continents, Osmond finished seventh.

Osmond's national championship resulted in her being named as the lone Canadian ladies' singles skater at the 2013 World Championships in London, Ontario. She placed a surprising fourth in the short program, which many in the Canadian skating community considered "the best global championship debut by a Canadian woman since the 1970s." Osmond struggled in the middle section of her long program, falling twice and stepping out of another jump, and placed tenth in the long program, for an eighth-place finish overall. This result secured two spots for Canada at the 2014 Winter Olympics. Interviewed afterwards, Osmond stated: "I had a little thought of a possible medal in my head, but I put it out of my mind and focused on my goal, which was top 10."

=== 2013–14 season: Second national title and Olympic medal ===
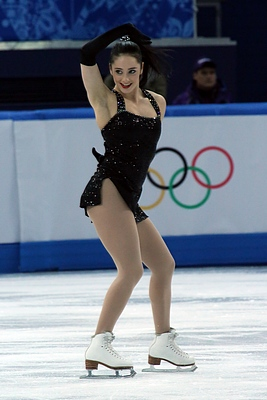
Osmond at the 2014 Winter Olympics

Osmond trained in southern California for about two weeks in August 2013 under the guidance of Walia and Frank Carroll. Due to a stress reaction in her left ankle, she was off the ice for most of September 2013. In late October, she competed at the 2013 Skate Canada International, placing fifth in the short program, but pulled out before the free skate due to a torn hamstring in her right leg. She also withdrew from the 2013 Rostelecom Cup but returned to competition at the 2014 Skate Canada Challenge. At the 2014 Canadian Championships, she placed first in both segments and repeated as national champion.

In February 2014, Osmond represented Canada at the Winter Olympics in Sochi. Osmond skated in both segments of the team event, placing fifth in both, and contributing to Canada's silver medal. She then competed in the individual ladies' singles event and finished thirteenth. She later referred to her performance in the individual event as "probably my worst short program all year." In March, she placed eleventh at the 2014 World Championships in Saitama, Japan.

=== 2014–15 season: Injury ===
For the 2014–15 season, Osmond was assigned to compete at 2014 Skate Canada International and 2014 Trophée Éric Bompard. She wanted to include a triple loop jump in her program, which she had never before attempted in competition. However, she had to withdraw from both competitions due to a broken leg, an injury she sustained on September 11, 2014. This injury caused Osmond to sit out the rest of the season. She had broken her right fibula and this would require two surgeries, one to implant and then another to remove a metal plate and seven screws. The injury caused her to consider retiring at the age of 18, believing that her Olympic dreams might be over. She later stated that the injury and subsequent rehabilitation actually helped her, as it made her more focused, more determined, and stronger.

=== 2015–16 season: Return to competition ===
Osmond began the 2015–16 season with gold at the 2015 CS Nebelhorn Trophy, an ISU Challenger Series event. Returning to the Grand Prix series at 2015 Skate Canada International, Osmond sprained her ankle in a practice session, but was subsequently deemed healthy enough to compete. In the short program she fell on a spin, injuring her groin and hip flexor, and had a "nightmarish" long program, falling several times and popping other jumps. She finished eleventh overall out of twelve skaters. She later finished sixth at the 2015 NHK Trophy. For the first time, she included the triple loop jump in her program during this season.

Although first after the short program at the 2016 Canadian Championships in Halifax, Nova Scotia, Osmond placed third overall after finishing 4.12 points behind Alaine Chartrand and 0.12 behind Gabrielle Daleman. She later credited the bronze medal finish at the National Championships as having prompted her to begin seeing a sports psychologist. Osmond ended the season at the 2016 Four Continents Championship, where she placed sixth, including a fourth-place finish in the long program, which she credited to progress from her therapy.

=== 2016–17 season: Third national title and World silver medal ===
At the start of October, Osmond won the 2016 CS Finlandia Trophy, ahead of Mao Asada and Anna Pogorilaya. Later that month, she received the silver medal, behind Evgenia Medvedeva, at the 2016 Skate Canada International. In November, she took silver behind Elena Radionova at the 2016 Cup of China, after placing first in the short and third in the free. Her results qualified her for the Grand Prix Final in Marseille, France, making her the first Canadian woman to qualify to the Grand Prix Final since Joannie Rochette did so in the 2009–10 season.

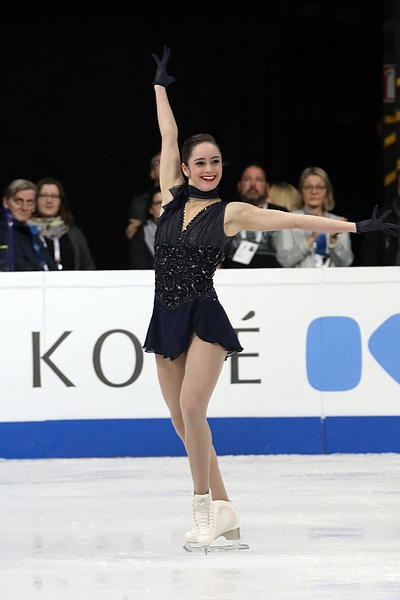
Osmond in the short program at the 2017 World Championships

At the end of January 2017, Osmond reclaimed her national title at the 2017 Canadian Championships, which she deemed an "incredible" feeling. Osmond was considered a favourite going into the 2017 Four Continents Championship as a result of her Grand Prix showing, and placed second in the short program. However, she fell three times during the long program and popped an axel jump, resulting in an overall fourth-place finish. Referring to the results as "a learning experience", she vowed to redouble preparation for the World Championships the following month.

In March 2017, Osmond was awarded the silver medal at the World Championships in Helsinki, Finland, having ranked second in both segments. It was the highest result at the event by a Canadian ladies' singles skater since 2009, when Rochette also won silver. As well, Canadian teammate Daleman won the bronze medal in the same event, a historic result. Assessing the result and the season as a whole, Osmond said that it was "what I have been working on the most this year: remaining in myself and in the moment, trusting myself and trusting my training, and finally it paid off."

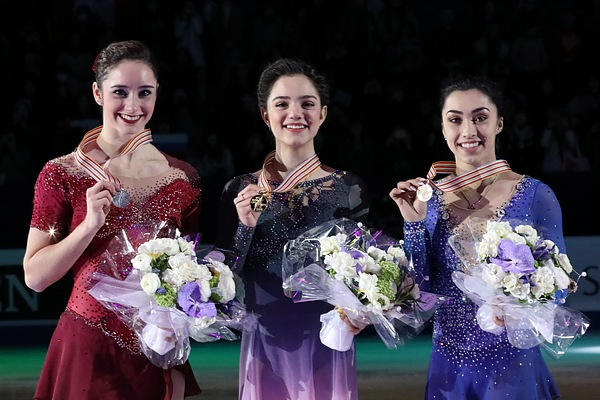
Osmond (left), Evgenia Medvedeva (center), and Gabrielle Daleman (right) at the 2017 World Championships

This was the first time Osmond participated in all the major competitions of the season: the Grand Prix series up to the final, the Canadian National, the Four Continent Championships, and the World Championships. She did not participate in the World Team Trophy at the end of the season.

Osmond's short program for the 2016–17 season, a medley of songs by the French singer Edith Piaf, would become her most acclaimed program to date, with Excelle Sports describing it as "widely heralded as tops among all 2017 offerings." Time would later praise it as "exuding a flirty sensuality reminiscent of Cyd Charisse." For her long program, Osmond had initially hoped to skate a version of Black Swan and Swan Lake. Both her coach, Ravi Walia, and her choreographer, Jeffrey Buttle, suggested La boheme as an alternative to further develop her performance ability, and this was ultimately adopted.

=== 2017–18 season: Two Olympic medals and World title ===
After initially developing a new short program to George Gershwin's "Summertime", she opted to retain her Edith Piaf program for another season, explaining "with it being an Olympic year I want to skate the two best programs I possibly can and I believe this short is." Having judged her La boheme program a success at developing her lines, this time her desire to skate to a Black Swan long program was realized. She described herself as a fan of Swan Lake's music from childhood, but that "when the movie Black Swan came out, I liked the darker side of it. I was much more dramatic. That’s what I find I can speak to more on the ice."

Osmond set a new personal best in the free skate at the 2017 CS Autumn Classic International in Montreal. She began her Grand Prix season at 2017 Skate Canada, which she won, five years after her victory in 2012 in her senior debut season. Despite errors in her long program, she pronounced herself "mostly just really happy" with how she skated. At her second Grand Prix assignment, the 2017 Internationaux de France, she won the bronze medal. These results qualified her again for the Grand Prix Final, this time in Nagoya, Japan, where she earned the bronze medal, behind Alina Zagitova and Maria Sotskova. At the 2018 Canadian Figure Skating Championships she placed second, again behind Daleman.

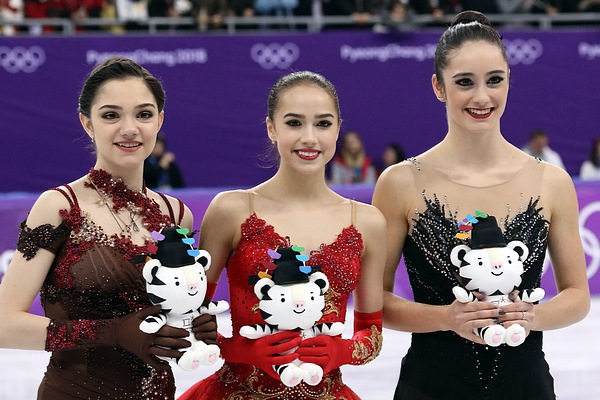
Osmond (right) with Evgenia Medvedeva (left) and Alina Zagitova (center) on the podium at the 2018 Winter Olympics.

As a member of Canada's figure skating team at the 2018 Winter Olympics, she placed third in the short program portion of the team event, where the Canadians ultimately won the gold medal. In the individual event, Osmond set new personal bests in the short program and free skate, and won the bronze medal behind Zagitova and Medvedeva. Osmond's was the twenty-seventh medal won by Canada at the 2018 Winter Olympics, setting a new national record and surpassing the total earned in the Vancouver Olympics eight years prior. It also set a record for Canada with four medals in figure skating at a single Winter Olympics. After winning two medals in 2018, Osmond would comment of the future of Canadian figure skating and of her new status as the veteran of the team saying: "Being on a team with such a veteran group, it's been so much fun, they've been so close and I've just kind of mingled my way into it. It will be exciting to see a new generation, and to see what they are willing to fight for and what they can accomplish, and if anyone needs help with anything, I hope that I can be a little bit of a mentor."

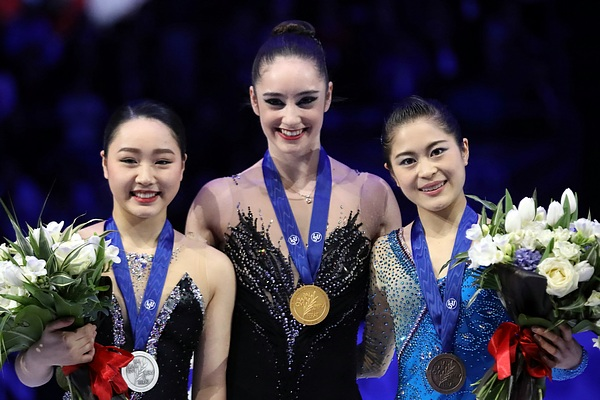
Osmond (centre) with Wakaba Higuchi (left) and Satoko Miyahara (right) at the 2018 World Championships podium

Osmond finished the season at the 2018 World Championships in Milan, Italy, where she was the defending silver medallist. She would subsequently describe the process of beginning training for the World Championships as difficult, feeling exhausted following the Olympics, but that her goal was to demonstrate that her Olympic free skate had not been a fluke. Osmond injured her ankle at her first practice session in Milan, but opted to compete. She placed fourth in the short program, following a botched double Axel. In the free skate she placed first, to finish first overall. She became the first Canadian woman to win the World Championships since Karen Magnussen in 1973 and the first Canadian woman since Magnussen to win multiple World Championship medals.

=== 2018–19 season: Retirement ===
On June 4, 2018 Osmond announced that she was planning to skip competitions on the Grand Prix series. The following day her participation in the cross-Canada "Thank You Canada Tour" was announced. On August 21, 2018 Osmond confirmed that she would not compete at all during the 2018–2019 season. She subsequently stated that her return to competitive skating is uncertain. On May 2, 2019, Skate Canada announced her retirement from competitive skating.

== Post-competitive career ==
Since retiring from competition, Osmond has continued to participate in Stars on Ice' annual Canadian tours. She also participated in both the "Thank You Canada" and "Rock the Rink" tours organized by Tessa Virtue and Scott Moir, and international show skating including Art on Ice.

Osmond moved to Brantford, Ontario, in 2019, and subsequently began coaching at the Brant Skating Club while not touring. She also began organizing training camps for figure skaters in her native Newfoundland. Subsequently, moving to Toronto, she began studying journalism at Centennial College in September 2020. In November 2020, she joined the staff of the Richmond Training Centre in Richmond Hill, Ontario as a skating coach. In April 2021, she returned to Edmonton to continue her journalism training. She now coaches at the Ice Palace Figure Skating Club in Edmonton.

== Skating technique ==
Osmond spins and jumps clockwise. She has landed 3F-3T, 3T-3T, 3S+2T+2Lo, 2A+2T+2Lo, and 2A-3T combinations in competition.

== Programs ==
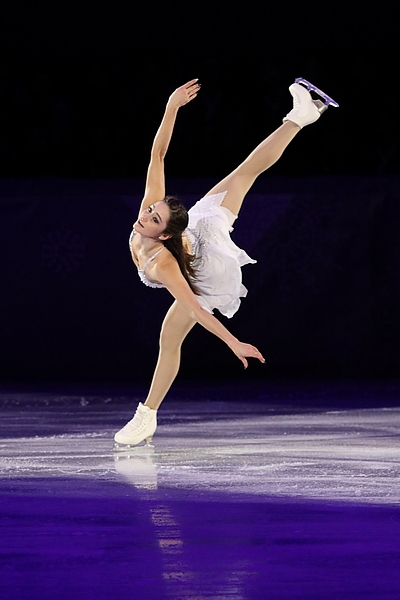
Osmond at the exhibition gala at the 2018 Winter Olympics

=== Post-2018 ===
Season	Exhibition
2019–2020	Thursday by Jess Glynne
2018–2019	Million Reasons by Lady Gaga, choreo. by Lance Vipond; Proud Mary by John Fogerty, covered by Tina Turner; Diggin' in the Dirt by Martin Fliegenschmidt, Claudio Pagonis, Matthias Hass, Herbie Crichlow, performed by Stefanie Heinzmann, skated with Ivan Righini; Stay the Night by James Blunt, skated with Clément Pinel

=== Pre-2018 ===
Season	Short program	Free skating	Exhibition
2017–2018	Sous le ciel de Paris; Milord performed by Édith Piaf choreo. by Lance Vipond; Summertime by George Gershwin choreo. by Lance Vipond	Swan Lake by Pyotr Ilyich Tchaikovsky; Andante Allegro; No. 24 Scene: Allegro; Black Swan by Clint Mansell; Stumbled Beginnings; Nina's Dream; choreo. by Jeffrey Buttle	Too Darn Hot by Cole Porter performed by Ella Fitzgerald choreo. by Shae-Lynn Bourne; Lost by Anouk choreo. by Jeffrey Buttle; Hallelujah performed by Tori Kelly; I Love It by Icona Pop
2016–2017	Sous le ciel de Paris; Milord performed by Édith Piaf choreo. by Lance Vipond	La bohème by Giacomo Puccini; Mimi Tells Her Story arranged by K. Hocking; Sono Andati; choreo. by Jeffrey Buttle	I Love It by Icona Pop; Hallelujah performed by Tori Kelly; Wild Horses by Natasha Bedingfield choreo. by Jeffrey Buttle
2015–2016	La Vie en rose performed by Cyndi Lauper choreo. by Lance Vipond	Tango medley by Astor Piazzolla; Danzarin; Oblivion; Tanguera; choreo. by Pasquale Camerlengo	Wild Horses by Natasha Bedingfield choreo. by Jeffrey Buttle; Lovefool by Postmodern Jukebox performed by Haley Reinhart choreo. by Lance Vipond; Human by Christina Perri
2014–2015	La Vie en rose performed by Cyndi Lauper choreo. by Lance Vipond	Tango medley by Astor Piazzolla; Danzarin; Oblivion; Tanguera; choreo. by Pasquale Camerlengo	
2013–2014	Big Spender; Rich Man's Frug (from Sweet Charity) choreo. by Lance Vipond	Asterix & Obelix: Mission Cleopatra by Philippe Chany; Original theme; Numerobis Theme; La poursuite; Cleopatra and Caesar by Claude-Michel Schönberg choreo. by Lance Vipond	Somewhere over the Rainbow by Jewel; Mamma Knows Best by Jessie J
2012–2013	Mambo N°8; Gwendoline by Pérez Prado choreo. by Lance Vipond	Carmen by Georges Bizet; Scene; Second Intermezzo; Adagio; choreo. by Lance Vipond	Candyman by Christina Aguilera; Reach; Hotel Nacional by Gloria Estefan
2011–2012	Your Good Name by Mychael Danna; Ganesh by A. R. Rahman choreo. by Lance Vipond	Introduction and Rondo Capriccioso in A minor by Camille Saint-Saëns choreo. by Lance Vipond	
2010–2011	A Day in the Life by Jeff Beck choreo. by Lance Vipond	Galicia Flamenca; Recuerdos de la Alhambra by Francisco Tarraga, Gino d'Auri choreo. by Lance Vipond	

== Competitive highlights ==
GP: Grand Prix; CS: Challenger Series; JGP: Junior Grand Prix

International
Event	09–10	10–11	11–12	12–13	13–14	14–15	15–16	16–17	17–18
Olympics					13th				3rd
Worlds				8th	11th			2nd	1st
Four Continents				7th			6th	4th	
GP Final								4th	3rd
GP France						WD			3rd
GP Cup of China								2nd	
GP NHK Trophy							6th		
GP Skate Canada				1st	WD	WD	11th	2nd	1st
GP Rostelecom Cup					WD				
CS Autumn Classic									1st
CS Finlandia								1st	
CS Nebelhorn							1st		
Nebelhorn Trophy				1st					
International: Junior
Junior Worlds			10th						
JGP Czech Republic		10th							
JGP Japan		9th							
National
Canadian Champ.	3rd J	6th J	3rd	1st	1st		3rd	1st	2nd
Team events
Olympics					2nd T				1st T
World Team; Trophy				2nd T 7th P					

== Detailed results ==
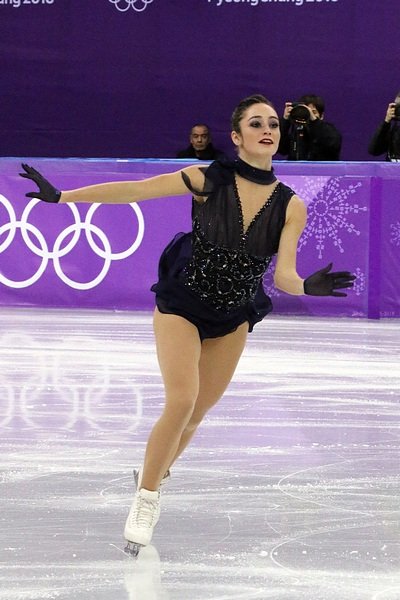
Osmond at the 2018 Winter Olympics

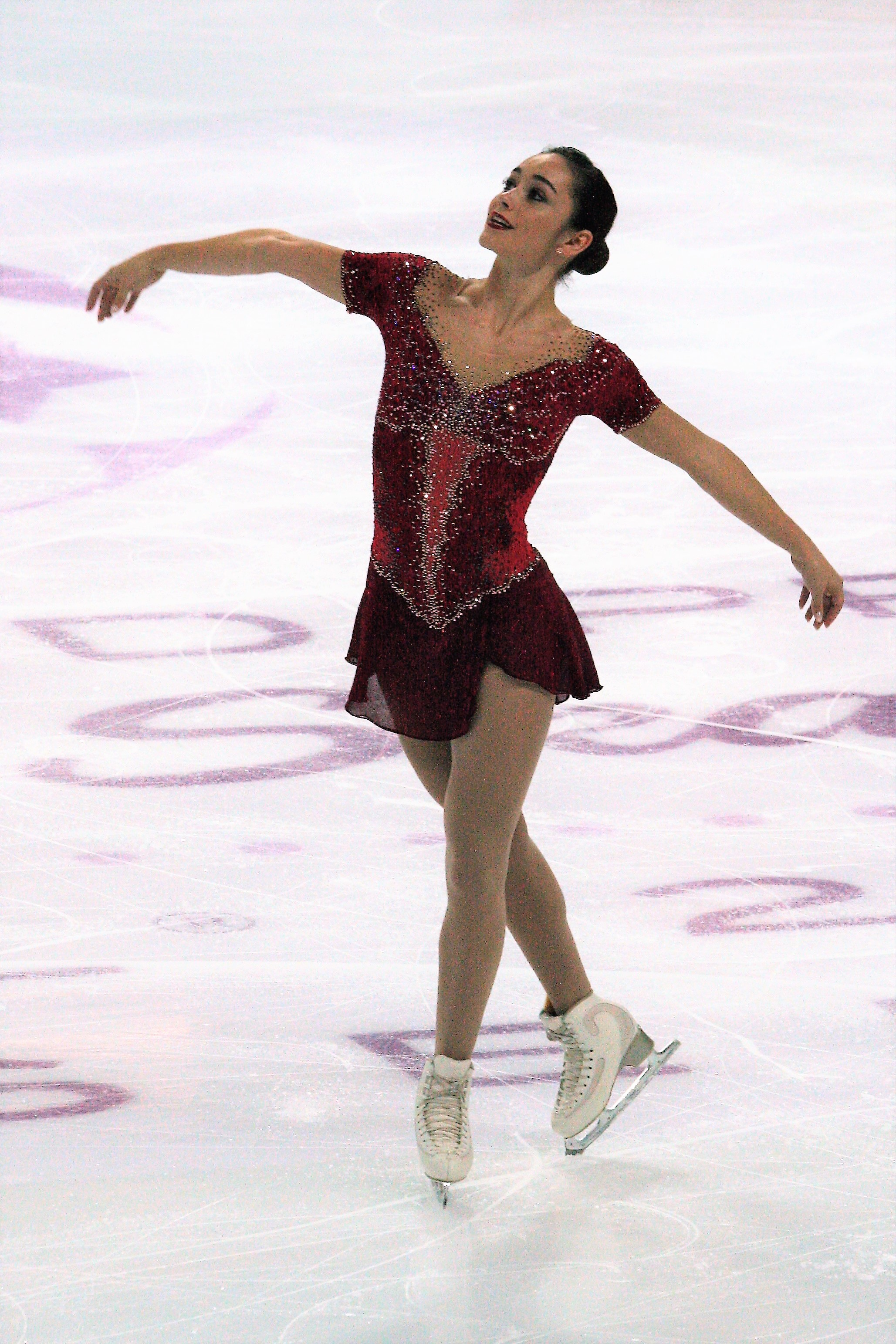
Osmond at the 2016–17 Grand Prix Final

Small medals for short and free programs awarded only at ISU Championships. At team events, medals awarded for team results only. Current ISU personal bests highlighted in bold and italic. ISU season's bests highlighted in bold.

2017–18 season
Date	Event	SP	FS	Total
March 21–23, 2018	2018 World Championships	4; 72.73	1; 150.50	1; 223.23
February 21–23, 2018	2018 Winter Olympics	3; **78.87**	3; **152.15**	3; **231.02**
February 9–12, 2018	2018 Winter Olympics – Team event	3; 71.38	–	1
January 8–14, 2018	2018 Canadian Championships	2; 71.41	2; 147.32	2; 218.73
December 7–10, 2017	2017–18 Grand Prix Final	1; 77.04	5; 138.12	3; 215.16
November 17–19, 2017	2017 Internationaux de France	1; 69.05	4; 137.72	3; 206.77
October 27–29, 2017	2017 Skate Canada	1; 76.06	1; 136.85	1; 212.91
September 20–23, 2017	2017 CS Autumn Classic	1; 75.21	1; 142.34	1; 217.55
2016–17 season
Date	Event	SP	FS	Total
March 29–April 2, 2017	2017 World Championships	2; **75.98**	2; **142.15**	2; **218.13**
February 15–19, 2017	2017 Four Continents Championships	2; 68.21	6; 115.96	4; 184.17
January 16–22, 2017	2017 Canadian Championships	1; 81.01	1; 138.65	1; 219.66
December 9–10, 2016	2016–17 Grand Prix Final	2; 75.54	4; 136.91	4; 212.45
November 18–20, 2016	2016 Cup of China	1; 72.20	3; 123.80	2; 196.00
October 28–30, 2016	2016 Skate Canada	2; 74.33	2; 132.12	2; 206.45
October 6–10, 2016	2016 CS Finlandia Trophy	3; 64.73	1; 122.54	1; 187.27
2015–16 season
Date	Event	SP	FS	Total
February 16–21, 2016	2016 Four Continents Championships	11; 56.14	4; 119.49	6; 175.63
January 18–24, 2016	2016 Canadian Championships	1; 70.63	3; 127.24	3; 197.87
November 27–29, 2015	2015 NHK Trophy	8; 57.07	7; 111.41	6; 168.48
October 30–Nov. 1, 2015	2015 Skate Canada	4; 59.21	12; 86.85	11; 146.06
September 24–26, 2015	2015 CS Nebelhorn Trophy	1; **59.67**	1; **119.74**	1; **179.41**
2013–14 season
Date	Event	SP	FS	Total
March 24–30, 2014	2014 World Championships	8; **62.92**	13; 107.72	11; **170.64**
February 19–20, 2014	2014 Winter Olympics	13; 56.18	13; **112.80**	13; 168.98
February 6–9, 2014	2014 Winter Olympics – Team event	5; 62.54	5; 110.73	2
January 9–15, 2014	2014 Canadian Championships	1; 70.30	1; 136.94	1; 207.24
October 25–27, 2013	2013 Skate Canada	5; 60.32	–	–
2012–13 season
Date	Event	SP	FS	Total
April 11–14, 2013	2013 World Team Trophy	7; 55.18	7; 109.67	2T / 7P; 164.85
March 13–17, 2013	2013 World Championships	4; **64.73**	10; 112.09	8; **176.82**
February 8–11, 2013	2013 Four Continents Championships	8; 56.22	7; 103.16	7; 159.38
January 13–20, 2013	2013 Canadian Championships	1; 70.04	1; 131.30	1; 201.34
October 26–28, 2012	2012 Skate Canada International	2; 60.56	2; **115.89**	1; 176.45
September 27–29, 2012	2012 Nebelhorn Trophy	2; 55.68	1; 114.51	1; 170.19

=== Junior level ===
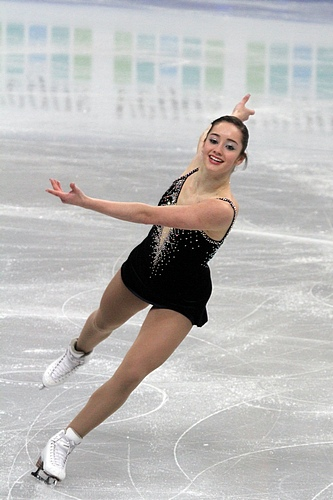
Osmond at the 2012 World Junior Championships

2011–12 season
Date	Event	Level	SP	FS	Total
February 27 – March 4, 2012	2012 World Junior Championships	Junior	9; **50.15**	10; **96.10**	10; **146.25**
January 16–22, 2012	2012 Canadian Championships	Senior	1; 56.94	4; 98.53	3; 155.47
2010–11 season
Date	Event	Level	SP	FS	Total
January 17–23, 2011	2011 Canadian Championships	Junior	5	8	6; 108.16
October 13–16, 2010	2010 JGP Czech	Junior	11; **38.96**	7; **72.94**	10; **111.90**
September 23–26, 2010	2010 JGP Japan	Junior	9; 37.78	8; 70.94	10; 108.72
2009–10 season
Date	Event	Level	SP	FS	Total
January 11–17, 2010	2010 Canadian Championships	Junior	5; 41.32	2; 71.30	3; 112.62
