= Roots to Grow =

Studio album by Stefanie Heinzmann

Studio album by Stefanie Heinzmann
- Released: September 11, 2009
- Length: 48:39
- Label: Polydor; Universal
- Producer: Paul NZA; Marek Pompetzki

Stefanie Heinzmann chronology
Masterplan (2008)	Roots to Grow (2009)	Stefanie Heinzmann (2012)

Singles from Roots to Grow
- 1. "No One (Can Ever Change My Mind)" Released: August 28, 2009; 2. "Unbreakable"/"Stop" Released: November 13, 2009; 3. "Roots to Grow" Released: May 28, 2010

Roots to Grow is the second studio album by Swiss recording artist Stefanie Heinzmann. It was released by Universal Music Domestic on September 11, 2009, in German-speaking Europe. The follow-up to her 2008 debut album Masterplan, the singer reteamed with producers Paul NZA and Marek Pompetzki to work on the bulk of the album. Pushing her music further into soul and funk genre, Roots to Grow features guest vocalists such as Gentleman, Ronan Keating, and the American R&B group Tower of Power.

Critics praised the album for its laid-back yet soulful blend of styles, while also highlighting Heinzmann's artistic authenticity, genre versatility, and her clear move away from formulaic mainstream pop. Commercially, Roots to Grow was less successful than its predecessor but reached number four on the Swiss Albums Chart and made it to the top twenty in Germany. Leading single "No One (Can Ever Change My Mind)" peaked at number twenty-seven on the Swiss Singles Chart.

== Background ==
In January 2008, Heinzmann won Stefan Raab's talent contest SSDSDSSWEMUGABRTLAD, organised by commercial television channel ProSieben for his daily late-nigh show TV total. As a result of her win, Heinzmann released her debut single "My Man Is a Mean Man," a number-one hit in Switzerland, and signed a record deal with Universal Records Domestic Division , kicking off work on her debut album Masterplan. Recorded in just nine days, it was largely produced by Paul NZA and Marek Pompetzki. Released in March 2008, the soul and funk-influenced record sold more than 230,000 copies and went platinum in Germany and Switzerland, making Heinzmann one of the biggest debuts of the year.

For her next project Roots to Grow, Heinzmann reteamed NZA and Pompetzki. Eager to take a more thoughtful approach after the rushed recording of her debut album, Universal granted her significantly more time for the recordings. In an interview with Kielerleben, Heinumann commented: "I think you can really hear the vocal development and the growth in my musical confidence. The producers have become like family by now, and I no longer had the fear I did with the first album, having to record 14 songs in nine days without any feedback. On top of that, it's a very musical record – with lots of live horns and strings – and incredibly diverse." Taking her sound further into the soul and funk genre, Roots to Grow features songwriting credits from Joss Stone, Rick Nowels, Guy Chambers, SoShy and Bryn Christopher.

== Critical reception ==
Professional ratings
Review scores
Source	Rating
CDStarts	7/10
laut.de	3/5 stars
MyFanbase	8/9

In his review for Männer magazine, editor Michael Rädel found that Heinzmann "simply makes music that relaxes. Effortless and laid-back, she sings with soulful ease over smooth reggae and soul rhythms, melting away worries and stress." He declared "I Don’t Know How to Hurt You", the upbeat "Bag It Up," and "No One (Can Ever Change My Mind)" as the album's highlights. Berliner Morgenpost's Silke Böttcher noted called Roots to Grow a "highly listenable and danceable mix of pop, rock, and soul, with detours into reggae, R&B, and jazz."

Artur Schulz from laut.de felt that "as a whole, the 14 tracks offer a varied cross-section of different styles [...] Even if this push for independence doesn't always fully succeed (yet), Heinzmann makes a clear effort to break free from the monotonous mainstream pop served up by so many casting show darlings. What remains consistently noticeable is that here’s an artist who’s genuinely and seriously invested in her work—without any need for pointless media antics. Stefanie Heinzmann in 2009: mainstream, but the better kind—always solid, and at times delivered with real punch." MyFanbase wrote that "with her second album, Heinzmann proves that she definitely has the potential to stay in the business for the long run—provided she continues to focus on her strengths while reinventing herself and avoiding repetition. Roots to Grow offers an enjoyable and varied mix of styles, all seamlessly brought together by Heinzmann’s distinctive voice into a refreshingly strong overall composition."

== Commercial performance ==
Although Roots to Grow did not achieve the same level of commercial success as its predecessor Masterplan (2009), it became another top ten-seller for Heinzmann, opening and peaking at number four on the Swiss Albums Chart. A steady seller, it would remain 18 weeks on the chart. In Germany, it debuted and peaked at number 13 on the German Albums Chart. It stayed in the Top 100 for 15 weeks. In Austria, the album charted noticeably lower than Masterplan, peaking at number 41 on the Austrian Albums Chart.

== Track listing ==
All tracks produced by Marek Pompetzki and Paul NZA.

Roots to Grow track listing
No.	Title	Writer(s)	Length
1.	"Bag It Up"	Luc Leroy; Yann Mace; Robin Jenssen; Ronny Svendsen; Nermin Harambasic; Anne Judith Wik	3:09
2.	"No One (Can Ever Change My Mind)"	Marek Pompetzki; Paul NZA; Alice Gernandt	3:44
3.	"Bet That I’m Better"	Shelly Poole; Tommy D.; Bryn Christopher	2:56
4.	"How Does It Feel"	Paul-NZA; Marek Pompetzki; Michel Zitron	4:08
5.	"Unbreakable"	Joss Stone; Rick Nowels	4:34
6.	"World on Fire"	Blair MacKichan; Guy Chambers	3:02
7.	"Love Fever"	Pompetzki; NZA; Gernandt	3:18
8.	"Roots to Grow" (featuring Gentleman)	Tilmann Otto; Peter Vale	4:28
9.	"There's a Reason"	Pompetzki; Kim Sanders; Paul Simm	3:25
10.	"No Substitute"	Ben Kohn; James Murray; Gavin Jones; Tom Barnes; Peter Kelleher	3:33
11.	"Stop"	Pompetzki; NZA; Sanders; Zitron	3:35
12.	"How Things Change"	Tommy Lee James; Lucie Silvas	3:08
13.	"I Don’t Know How to Hurt You"	Lone Proneur; Deborah Epstein; Walter Turbitt	3:16
14.	"Wasting My Time"	Christopher; Andy Murray; Christian Ballard; Brian Harris; Russ Ballard	3:23
Total length:			48:39

Deluxe edition bonus tracks
No.	Title	Writer(s)	Length
15.	"Ain't No Mountain High Enough" (featuring Ronan Keating)	Nickolas Ashford; Valerie Simpson	2:42
16.	"Since You've Been Gone (Baby, Baby, Sweet Baby)" (featuring Tower of Power)	Aretha Franklin; Ted White	4:09
17.	"Appetite for Love"	Deborah "SoShy" Epstein; Guz Lally	3:02

== Charts ==
=== Weekly charts ===
Weekly chart performance for Roots to Grow
Chart (2009)	Peak position
Austrian Albums (Ö3 Austria)	41
German Albums (Offizielle Top 100)	13
Swiss Albums (Schweizer Hitparade)	4

=== Year-end charts ===
Year-end chart performance for Roots to Grow
Chart (2009)	Position
Swiss Albums (Schweizer Hitparade)	91
