= Revolution (Stefanie Heinzmann song) =

Single by Stefanie Heinzmann

from the album Masterplan
- Released: August 1, 2008
- Genre: Pop; soul pop
- Length: 2:42
- Label: Universal Music
- Songwriter(s): Joby Baker; Alexandria Maillot; Amanda Maillot
- Producer(s): Marek Pompetzki; Paul NZA

Stefanie Heinzmann singles chronology
"Like a Bullet" (2008)	"Revolution" (2008)	"The Unforgiven" (2008)

"Revolution" is a song by Swiss recording artist Stefanie Heinzmann. It was written by Alexandria Maillot, Amanda Maillot and Joby Baker for her debut album Masterplan (2008), while production was helmed by Marek Pompetzki and Paul NZA. Released as the album's third single, it reached the top fifty of the German Singles Chart.

== Charts ==
=== Weekly charts ===
Chart (2008)	Peak position
Germany (GfK)	47
Switzerland (Schweizer Hitparade)	75
