= On Fire (Stefanie Heinzmann song) =

Single by Stefanie Heinzmann

from the album Chance of Rain
- Released: 24 July 2015
- Genre: Pop; pop rock
- Length: 3:33
- Label: Universal Music
- Songwriters: Joachim Persson; Audra Mae; Johan Carl Axel Alkenäs; Niclas Aaake Molinder
- Producer: Electric

Stefanie Heinzmann singles chronology
"In the End" (2015)	"On Fire" (2015)	"Stranger in This World" (2015)

"On Fire" is a song by Swiss recording artist Stefanie Heinzmann. It was written by Joachim Persson, Audra Mae, Johan Carl Axel Alkenäs, and Niclas Molinder for her fourth studio album Chance of Rain (2015), while production was helmed by Henrik Barman Michelsen and Edvard Førre Erfjord under their production moniker Electric. The song was released as the album's second single in July 2015 and reached the top forty of the Swiss Singles Chart.

== Charts ==
=== Weekly charts ===
Weekly chart performance for "On Fire"
Chart (2015)	Peak position
Switzerland (Schweizer Hitparade)	40
