= Unbreakable (Stefanie Heinzmann song) =

Single by Stefanie Heinzmann

from the album Roots to Grow
- Released: November 13, 2009
- Recorded: 2009
- Genre: Pop; soul pop
- Length: 4:34
- Label: Universal Domestic Pop
- Songwriters: Joss Stone; Rick Nowels
- Producers: Marek Pompetzki; Paul NZA

Stefanie Heinzmann singles chronology
"No One" (2009)	"Unbreakable" / "Stop" (2009)	"Roots to Grow" (2010)

"Unbreakable" is a song by Swiss recording artist Stefanie Heinzmann. Written by Joss Stone and Rick Nowels, it was produced by Marek Pompetzki and Paul NZA for her second studio album, Roots to Grow (2009), and was released as the album's second single.

In the same year, the song was also recorded by American girl group BG5, whose cover was produced by Rock Mafia and released as their debut single.

== Charts ==
=== Weekly charts ===
Chart (2009)	Peak position
Germany (GfK)	68
