= Damned (song) =

Single by Eva Avila

from the album Give Me the Music
- Released: 2008
- Genre: Soul; R&B; pop
- Length: 3:38
- Label: Sony Music
- Songwriters: Greg Johnston, Luke McMaster, Sherry St. Germain, Scott Jacoby

Eva Avila singles chronology
"Give Me the Music" (2008)	"Damned" (2008)	"No More Coming Back" (2009)

"Damned" is the second single taken from Eva Avila's Give Me the Music album. The single reached Chum FMs 10 Most Wanted countdown numerous times and peaked at 21 on the CHUM Chart and 83 on the Canadian Hot 100.

== Music video ==
Scenes of the music video are shown with Avila sitting on a couch in a room, looking at pictures on the wall and showing her anger at her friends boyfriend. The music video premiered on eTalk on February 25, 2009.

== Chart performance ==
Chart (2009)	Peak position
Canadian BDS Airplay Chart	67
Canadian Hot 100	83
Chum Chart Top 30	21
