= Roots to Grow (song) =

Single by Stefanie Heinzmann featuring Gentleman

from the album Roots to Grow
- Released: October 28, 2010
- Recorded: 2009
- Genre: Reggae; soul pop
- Length: 3:25
- Label: Universal Domestic Pop
- Songwriter(s): Tilmann Otto; Peter Vale
- Producer(s): Marek Pompetzki; Paul NZA

Stefanie Heinzmann singles chronology
"Unbreakable" / "Stop" (2009)	"Roots to Grow" (2010)	"Diggin' in the Dirt" (2012)

"Roots to Grow" is a song by Swiss recording artist Stefanie Heinzmann and German musician Gentleman. Produced by Marek Pompetzki and Paul NZA for her second studio album, Roots to Grow (2009), it was released as the album's third single.

== Charts ==
Chart (2010)	Peak position
Austria (Ö3 Austria Top 40)	61
Germany (GfK)	16
Switzerland (Schweizer Hitparade)	56
