= All We Need Is Love (album) =

Studio album by Stefanie Heinzmann
- Released: March 22, 2019
- Length: 39:47
- Label: BMG
- Producer: Johan Alkenäs; Alle Farben; Sebastian Arman; John Gordon; Steffen Graef; Sune Haansbæk; David Jürgens; Joacim Persson

Stefanie Heinzmann chronology
Chance of Rain (2015)	All We Need Is Love (2019)	Labyrinth (2021)

All We Need Is Love is the fifth studio album by Swiss recording artist Stefanie Heinzmann. It was released by BMG Rights Management on March 22, 2019 in German-speaking Europe. It became Heinzmann's second album to top the Swiss Albums Chart following her debut album Masterplan (2008).

== Critical reception ==
Professional ratings
Review scores
Source	Rating
laut.de	3/5 stars

Moritz Fehrle from laut.de rated the album three stars out of five. He wrote that "as the title suggests, All We Need Is Love is full of clichés, but overall it's a surprisingly lighthearted affair. Towards the end, the grandiose choruses with their uplifting slogans start to wear on my nerves. However, thanks to Stefanie Heinzmann's vocal performance, the album still rises above the typical German radio pop standard." St. Galler Tagblatt's Stefan Künzli felt that with All We Need Is Love, Heinzmann "has fully arrived in pop [...] The album features internationally produced tracks [and] is a diverse and varied album. The biggest musical innovation, however, lies in Heinzmann’s vocals, which not only shine and pack power but also reveal the tender, intimate, and fragile side of the Valais native."

== Commercial performance ==
Released in March 22, 2019, All We Need Is Love opened at number one on the Swiss Albums Chart. It was Heinzmann second project to reach the top spot in Switzerland, following her 2008 debut album Masterplan and a string of top five albums from 2009 to 2015. It was later ranked 83rd on the chart's 2019 year-end listing. In Germany, the album debuted and peaked at number 18, marking her fifth consecutive top 20 album.

== Track listing ==
All We Need Is Love track listing
No.	Title	Writer(s)	Producer(s)	Length
1.	"Not Giving It Up"	Stefanie Heinzmann; Patrick Fa; Jake Isaac; Steffen Graef; Carlton Haley; Oluwaferanmi Ogunseyinde; Bastien Paul; Rocco Testori; Mia Dieckow	Graef	3:23
2.	"All We Need Is Love"	Heinzmann; Patrick Fa; Isaac; Phil Cook	Graef; Kiko Masbaum^{[a]}	2:53
3.	"Shadows"	Heinzmann; Joacim Persson; Johan Alkenäs; Sebastian Arman; Fa	Persson; Alkenäs; Arman	3:09
4.	"Home"	Heinzmann; John Gordon; Sune Haansbæk; Fa; Caroline Ermer	Gordon; Haansbæk	3:42
5.	"Mother's Heart"	Heinzmann; Joe Walter; Morten Aamodt	Graef	3:23
6.	"Every Day Is a Good Day"	Heinzmann; Gordon; Haansbæk; Fa; Ermer	Gordon; Haansbæk	3:27
7.	"You Get Me"	Heinzmann; Walter	David Jürgens	3:20
8.	"Brave"	Heinzmann; Tim Deal; Fa; JP Ericson	Graef	3:08
9.	"What I Do"	Heinzmann; Jürgens; Ali Zuckowski	Jürgens	3:50
10.	"Still Have Love for You"	Heinzmann; Deal; Corey Sanders	Graef	3:01
11.	"Bigger"	Heinzmann; Claudio Heinzmann; Jamie Hartmann	Graef	3:32
12.	"Build a House" (featuring Alle Farben)	Heinzmann; Dennis Bierbrodt; Jürgen Dohr; Guido Kramer; Stefan Dabruck; Deal; Frans Zimmer; Anna Stone; Arne Ghosh	Bierbrodt; Dohr; Kramer; Zimmer	3:02
Total length:				39:47

Notes

- ^{^[a]} signifies a co-producer

== Charts ==
=== Weekly charts ===
Weekly chart performance for All We Need Is Love
Chart (2019)	Peak position
German Albums (Offizielle Top 100)	18
Swiss Albums (Schweizer Hitparade)	1

=== Year-end charts ===
Year-end chart performance for All We Need Is Love
Chart (2019)	Position
Swiss Albums (Schweizer Hitparade)	83

== Release history ==
All We Need Is Love release history
Region	Date	Editions	Formats	Label	Ref.
Various	March 22, 2019	Standard	CD; digital download; streaming	BMG Rights Management	
Various	December 11, 2020	Acoustic	CD; digital download; streaming	BMG Rights Management	
