= Stop (Stefanie Heinzmann song) =

Single by Stefanie Heinzmann

from the album Roots to Grow
- Released: November 13, 2009
- Recorded: 2009
- Genre: Pop; soul pop
- Length: 4:34
- Label: Universal Domestic Pop
- Songwriter(s): Marek Pompetzki; Paul NZA; Kim Sanders; Michel Zitron
- Producer(s): Marek Pompetzki; Paul NZA

Stefanie Heinzmann singles chronology
"No One" (2009)	"Stop" / "Unbreakable" (2009)	"Roots to Grow" (2010)

"Stop" is a song by Swiss recording artist Stefanie Heinzmann. It was written by Kim Sanders, Michel Zitron, Marek Pompetzki, and Paul NZA for her second studio album, Roots to Grow (2009). while production was helmed by Pompetzki and NZA. The song was released as the album's second single along with "Unbreakable".
