= No One (Can Ever Change My Mind) =

Single by Stefanie Heinzmann

from the album Roots to Grow
- Released: August 28, 2009
- Recorded: 2009
- Genre: Pop; soul pop
- Length: 3:35
- Label: Universal Domestic Pop
- Songwriter(s): Marek Pompetzki; Paul NZA; Alice Gernandt
- Producer(s): Marek Pompetzki; Paul NZA

Stefanie Heinzmann singles chronology
"The Unforgiven" (2008)	"No One (Can Ever Change; My Mind)" (2009)	"Unbreakable" / "Stop" (2009)

"No One (Can Ever Change My Mind)" is a song by Swiss recording artist Stefanie Heinzmann. It was written by Marek Pompetzki, Paul NZA, and Alice Gernandt, while production was overseen by Pompetzki and NZA. The song was released as the first single from Heinzmann's second studio album, Roots to Grow. The song was re-recorded in Simlish, a fictional language used in the bestselling video game franchise The Sims, and included in The Sims 3: World Adventures.

== Charts ==
=== Weekly charts ===
Chart (2009)	Peak position
Austria (Ö3 Austria Top 40)	71
Germany (GfK)	36
Switzerland (Schweizer Hitparade)	27
