= Circles (Stefanie Heinzmann album) =

Studio album by Stefanie Heinzmann
- Released: 10 October 2025
- Length: 37:13
- Label: Seven.One Starwatch
- Producer: Steffen Graef; Jake Isaac; Litening

Stefanie Heinzmann chronology
Labyrinth (2021)	Circles (2025)

Circles is the seventh studio album by Swiss singer Stefanie Heinzmann. It was released by Seven.One Starwatch on 10 October 2025.

== Critical reception ==
LifeOnStage found thath Circles was a "pop album full of soul, personality, and authenticity. Vocally, [Heinzmann] showcases a range like never before — at times powerful and present, then delicate, airy, and restrained. With live-recorded drums, gospel choirs from London, analog synths, and modern pop production, the result is a soundscape that feels warm, contemporary, and surprisingly layered."

== Commercial performance ==
Released on 10 October 2025, Circles opened at number ten on the Swiss Albums Chart. It marked Heinzmann's seventh consecutive top ten album in her home country, but was also the first one to miss the top five. In Germany, the album opened and peaked at number 22 on the German Albums Chart. It was Heinzmann's first album not to reach the top 20 of the chart.

== Track listing ==
Circles track listing
No.	Title	Writer(s)	Producer(s)	Length
1.	"Circles"	Jake Isaac; Litening; Monica Jurt	Isaac; Litening	0:56
2.	"Shine"	Stefanie Heinzmann; Litening; Steffen Graef; Steven Bashir	Isaac; Litening; Graef	2:56
3.	"Myself"	Heinzmann; Isaac; Litening; Simon Klose; Bashir	Isaac; Litening	2:20
4.	"Talk"	Heinzmann; Isaac; Graef; Anna Stone	Isaac; Litening; Graef	3:07
5.	"Oceans"	Heinzmann; Isaac; Litening	Isaac; Litening	3:10
6.	"Power"	Heinzmann; Isaac; Litening; Fez	Isaac; Litening	2:44
7.	"Hurricane"	Heinzmann; Isaac; Litening	Isaac; Litening	2:35
8.	"Water"	Heinzmann; Isaac; Litening	Isaac; Litening	2:39
9.	"Feel"	Heinzmann; Isaac; Litening; Fez	Isaac; Litening	3:01
10.	"Hands"	Heinzmann; Isaac; Litening; Fez	Isaac; Graef	2:23
11.	"Rain"	Heinzmann; Isaac; Graef; Stone	Graef	3:46
12.	"Good"	Isaac	Graef	3:47
13.	"Space"	Heinzmann; Isaac; Graef; Stone	Isaac; Litening; Graef	3:24
Total length:				37:13

Notes

- ^{^[a]} signifies a co-producer

== Charts ==
Chart performance for Circles
Chart (2025)	Peak position
German Albums (Offizielle Top 100)	22
German Pop Albums (Offizielle Top 100)	8
Swiss Albums (Schweizer Hitparade)	10

== Release history ==
Circles release history
Region	Date	Format	Label	Ref(s)
Various	10 October 2025	CD; digital download; streaming	Seven.One Starwatch	
