= Labyrinth (Stefanie Heinzmann album) =

Studio album by Stefanie Heinzmann
- Released: 14 May 2021
- Length: 31:24
- Label: BMG
- Producer: Steffen Graef; Pascal "Kalli" Reinhardt; Daniel Schaub

Stefanie Heinzmann chronology
All We Need Is Love (2019)	Labyrinth (2021)	Circles (2025)

Labyrinth is the sixth studio album by Swiss singer Stefanie Heinzmann. It was released by BMG Rights Management on 14 May 2021.

== Critical reception ==
Professional ratings
Review scores
Source	Rating
laut.de	2/5 stars
MusicHeadQuarter	7/9

MusicHeadQuarter magazine felt that Labyrinth was "poppier than its predecessor, with less groove and fewer funky instrumentals. Still, it kicks off with full energy across its (unfortunately only) 31-minute runtime. Above all, it delivers feel-good tracks with lots of electronic elements and a beat that gives it a distinctly international sound. It’s great for radio, though it doesn't offer as much variety as previous releases." Radio WMW wrote that Heinzmann's "voice and musical touch, as always, come through clearly on her sixth studio album. The record is meant to lift spirits and bring positive energy." Less impressed, Toni Hennig from laut.de rated the album two stars out of five and found that it "sounds too much like a modular system. Labyrinth could have been an above-average album if the good approaches at the beginning had been further developed. There are clearly more important things than wasting your life with this disc, such as a walk in the fresh air or a trip to the bakery."

== Commercial performance ==
Released on 14 May 2021, Labyrinth debuted and peaked at number four on the Swiss Albums Chart. It was Heinzmann's sixth consecutive top five album in her home country. In Germany, the album opened and peaked at number 19 on the German Albums Chart. It marked her sixth consecutive album to reached the top 20 of the chart.

== Track listing ==
Labyrinth track listing
No.	Title	Writer(s)	Producer(s)	Length
1.	"Labyrinth"	Stefanie Heinzmann; Michelle Leonard; Morten Aamodt	Steffen Graef	3:09
2.	"Best Life"	Heinzmann; Fiona Bevan; Timothy "Hight" Deal; Arne Ghosh	Daniel Schaub	3:00
3.	"Would You Still Love Me"	Heinzmann; Joe Walter; Graef	Graef	3:11
4.	"Knocking Down the Wall"	Heinzmann; Walter; Graef	Graef	3:15
5.	"Face the Music"	Heinzmann; Bevan; Deal; Ghosh	Schaub	3:47
6.	"Better Than Nothing"	Heinzmann; Emma Rosen; Graef	Graef	2:54
7.	"Colors"	Heinzmann; Walter; Pascal "Kalli" Reinhardt	Reinhardt	3:08
8.	"You're Not Alone"	Heinzmann; Rosen; Graef	Graef	2:36
9.	"Believe"	Heinzmann; Leonhard; Aamodt	Graef	2:53
10.	"Life Goes On"	Heinzmann; Walter; Reinhardt	Reinhardt	3:24
Total length:				31:24

Notes

- ^{^[a]} signifies a co-producer

== Charts ==
Chart performance for Labyrinth
Chart (2019)	Peak position
German Albums (Offizielle Top 100)	19
Swiss Albums (Schweizer Hitparade)	4

== Release history ==
Release history and formats for Labyrinth
Region	Date	Editions	Formats	Label	Ref.
Various	14 May 2021	Standard	CD; digital download; streaming	BMG Rights Management	
Various	3 December 2022	Deluxe	CD; digital download; streaming	BMG Rights Management	
