= Chance of Rain (Stefanie Heinzmann album) =

Studio album by Stefanie Heinzmann
- Released: 27 March 2015
- Length: 46:31
- Label: Universal Domestic Pop
- Producer: Beatgees; Electric; Martin Fliegenschmidt; Claudio Pagonis

Stefanie Heinzmann chronology
Stefanie Heinzmann (2012)	Chance of Rain (2015)	All We Need Is Love (2019)

Singles from Chance of Rain
- 1. "In the End" Released: 5 March 2015; 2. "On Fire" Released: 31 July 2015; 3. "Stranger in This World" Released: 27 November 2015

Chance of Rain is the fourth studio album by Swiss recording artist Stefanie Heinzmann. It was released by Universal Music Domestic on 27 March 2015 in German-speaking Europe.

== Critical reception ==
Professional ratings
Review scores
Source	Rating
laut.de	2/5 stars
Plattentests	5/10

Luzerner Zeitung editor Michael Graber noted that Chance of Rain was sounding a "bit different, somewhat unusual. The Motown elements [on previous projects] have lessened (though they’re still present), and the overall feel is a touch more modern, with some electronic elements added in." He added: "Her pop with lots of funk rarely feels interchangeable — if ever — but it’s not always truly captivating either. Moritz Fehrle from laut.de rated the album two stars out of five. He felt that on Chance of Rain "Heinzmann relies on classic pop ingredients and makes no secret of it. Tracks like "In the End" and" On Fire" are bursting with a kind of impulsive energy that's easy to believe coming from the Swiss singer. The opener, meanwhile, sounds like an Ellie Goulding–Calvin Harris collaboration, just without the electronic disco polish." He concluded_ "Even though, apart from fillers like "Close to the Sun," the album offers catchy and entertaining songs, nothing really sticks that sets Heinzmann apart as a distinctive artist. Chance of Rain was supposed to finally show some guts — but even with a thorough search, they’re hard to find."

== Commercial performance ==
Released on 27 March 2015, Chance of Rain debuted and peaked at number four on the Swiss Albums Chart. It was Heinzmann's fourth consecutive top five album in her home country. Elsewhere, the album opened and peaked at number 20 on the German Albums Chart. While it marked her lowest-charting project in Germany it, it also emerged as her fourth consecutive album to reached the top 20 of the chart. In Austria, Chance of Rain became her first album to miss the charts.

== Track listing ==
Chance of Rain track listing
No.	Title	Writer(s)	Producer(s)	Length
1.	"In the End"	Stefanie Heinzmann; Edvard Førre Erfjord; Henrik Michelsen; Sam Romans	Electric	3:22
2.	"On Fire"	Joachim Persson; Audra Mae; Johan Carl Axel Alkenäs; Niclas Aaake Molinder	Electric	3:33
3.	"Stranger in This World"	Heinzmann; Claudio Heinzmann; Beatgees; Laila Samuels	Beatgees	3:59
4.	"Glad to Be Alive"	Heinzmann; Mighty Mike; Harlan Silverman	Beatgees	3:27
5.	"Falling"	Heinzmann; Erfjord; Michelsen; Romans	Electric	3:11
6.	"Closer to the Sun"	Heinzmann; Marek Pompetzki; Paul NZA; Cecil Remmler; Katrina Noorbergen	Beatgees	3:35
7.	"Devil On My Shoulder"	Heinzmann; David Jürgens; Michael Hunter Ochs	Electric	3:30
8.	"Little Too Long"	Alexander Shuckburgh; Samuel Dixon; Carly Connor	Beatgees	3:39
9.	"Little Universe"	Heinzmann; Ochs; Pat Fa	Claudio Pagonis; Martin Fliegenschmidt	4:12
10.	"Waterfall"	Heinzmann; Ian Dench; Fa; Mike Kintish	Beatgees	3:30
11.	"What's On Your Mind"	Heinzmann; Erfjord; Michelsen; Romans; Fa	Electric	3:02
12.	"Chance of Rain"	Heinzmann; Heinzmann; Noorbergen; Joe Walter; Nicolas Rebscher	Beatgees	3:39
13.	"Thank You"	Heinzmann; Seth Jones	Pagonis; Fliegenschmidt	3:58
Total length:				46:31

== Charts ==
=== Weekly charts ===
Weekly chart performance for Chance of Rain
Chart (2015)	Peak position
German Albums (Offizielle Top 100)	20
Swiss Albums (Schweizer Hitparade)	4

=== Year-end charts ===
Year-end chart performance for Chance of Rain
Chart (2012)	Position
Swiss Albums (Schweizer Hitparade)	46
