= Stefanie Heinzmann (album) =

Studio album by Stefanie Heinzmann
- Released: 16 March 2012
- Length: 48:13
- Label: Universal Domestic Pop
- Producer: Martin Fliegenschmidt; Kiko Masbaum; Paul NZA; Claudio Pagonis; Marek Pompetzki; Cecil Remmler

Stefanie Heinzmann chronology
Roots to Grow (2009)	Stefanie Heinzmann (2012)	Chance of Rain (2015)

Singles from Stefanie Heinzmann
- 1. "Diggin' in the Dirt" Released: 17 February 2012; 2. "Show Me the Way" Released: 10 August 2012

Stefanie Heinzmann is the third studio album by Swiss recording artist Stefanie Heinzmann, released by Universal Music Domestic on 16 March 2012 in German-speaking Europe.

== Critical reception ==
Professional ratings
Review scores
Source	Rating
Focus	8/10
laut.de	2/5 stars

Julia Bähr, writing for Focus magazine, felt that the album "stands on its own and doesn’t need a polished, pleasing backdrop." She noted that "Heinzmann sounds more modern, younger, and also more relaxed" on Stefanie Heinzmann and concluded: "All in all, the album is very successful: a big dose of fresh soul with beats and character." Verena Riedl from Beatblogger wrote that "overall, the new album is a bit poppier than her previous works. But in this case, poppier doesn’t mean worse; on the contrary, the songs are bursting with creativity and authenticity, and almost all of them have that certain catchy quality that some tracks on Roots to Grow were still missing. Above all, Stefanie Heinzmann showcases an impressive level of variety—no two songs sound alike, covering an extremely wide musical spectrum from soul and pop to disco, with subtle blues and rock influences." Less impressed, Kai Butterweck from laut.de rated the album two stars out of five and stated that Stefanie Heinzmann "stinks like wasted talent."

== Commercial performance ==
Released on 16 March 2012, Stefanie Heinzmann opened and peaked at number three on the Swiss Albums Chart. It would remain 18 weeks on the chart and was ranked 46th on its 2012 year-end listing. In Germany, the album debuted at number eight, becoming Heinzmann's second top ten album there. In Austria, Stefanie Heinzmann reached number 24.

== Track listing ==
Stefanie Heinzmann – standard edition
No.	Title	Writer(s)	Producer(s)	Length
1.	"Fire"	Ian Dench; Alice Smith; Sharon Vaughn	Marek Pompetzki; Paul NZA; Cecil Remmler	4:06
2.	"Diggin' in the Dirt"	Matthias Hass; Claudio Pagonis; Herbie Crichlow; Martin Fliegenschmidt	Kiko Masbaum; Pagonis; Fliegenschmidt	3:33
3.	"Not at All"	Chantal Kreviazuk; Pompetzki; NZA; Remmler	Pompetzki; NZA; Remmler	3:00
4.	"Coming Up for Air"	Kim Sanders; Stefanie Heinzmann; Claudio Heinzmann; Moritz Stahl; A. Luis	Pompetzki; NZA; Remmler	2:52
5.	"Everyone's Lonely"	Ben Cullum; Jamie Cullum	Pompetzki; NZA; Remmler	3:41
6.	"Another Love Song"	Tim Hawes; Matthias Hass; Willie Weeks; Obi Mhondera	Pompetzki; NZA; Remmler	3:47
7.	"Stain on My Heart"	Mischke; Pompetzki; NZA; Remmler	Pompetzki; NZA; Remmler	3:10
8.	"Second Time Around"	Mischke; Pompetzki; NZA; Remmler	Pompetzki; NZA; Remmler	3:02
9.	"Ain't No Way"	Mischke; Pompetzki; NZA; Remmler	Pompetzki; NZA; Remmler	3:00
10.	"Show Me the Way"	John Gordon; Julie Frost	Pompetzki; NZA; Remmler	3:06
11.	"This Old Heart of Mine"	Eddie Holland; Brian Holland; Lamont Dozier; Sylvia Moy	Pompetzki; NZA; Remmler	2:36
12.	"Numb the Pleasure"	S. Heinzmann; C. Heinzmann; Stahl; Jemma Endersby	Pompetzki; NZA; Remmler	2:56
13.	"You Made Me See"	Sanders; S. Heinzmann; C. Heinzmann; Stahl; Endersby	Pompetzki; NZA; Remmler	2:48
Total length:				48:13

Stefanie Heinzmann – Special deluxe edition
No.	Title	Writer(s)	Producer(s)	Length
14.	"Old Flame"	Pompetzki; NZA; Remmler; Frost	Pompetzki; NZA; Remmler	3:43
15.	"Home to Me"	Rob Hyman; Eric Bazilian; Patrick Fa; S. Heinzmann; C. Heinzmann	Pompetzki; NZA; Remmler	2:54
16.	"Hurting You Is Hurting Me"	Pagonis; Fliegenschmidt	Pompetzki; NZA; Remmler	2:59

Amazon.de MP3 Version
No.	Title	Producer(s)	Length
16.	"Only One"	Pompetzki; NZA; Remmler	3:13

== Charts ==
=== Weekly charts ===
Weekly chart performance for Stefanie Heinzmann
Chart (2012)	Peak position
Austrian Albums (Ö3 Austria)	24
German Albums (Offizielle Top 100)	8
Swiss Albums (Schweizer Hitparade)	3

=== Year-end charts ===
Year-end chart performance for Stefanie Heinzmann
Chart (2012)	Position
Swiss Albums (Schweizer Hitparade)	46

== Release history ==
Stefanie Heinzmann release history
Region	Date	Format	Label	Ref(s)
Various	16 March 2012	CD; digital download	Universal Music Domestic Pop	
