= Like a Bullet =

Single by Stefanie Heinzmann

from the album Masterplan
- Released: April 18, 2008
- Length: 3:33
- Label: Universal Music Domestic
- Songwriter(s): Niara Scarlett; Jens Bergmark; Henrik Korpi; Mattias Franzen
- Producer(s): Marek Pompetzki; Paul NZA

Stefanie Heinzmann singles chronology
"My Man Is a Mean Man" (2008)	"Like a Bullet" (2008)	"Revolution" (2008)

"Like a Bullet" is a song by Swiss recording artist Stefanie Heinzmann. It was written by Niara Scarlett, Jens Bergmark, Henrik Korpi, and Mattias Franzen and produced by Marek Pompetzki and Paul NZA for her debut album Masterplan (2008). Released as the album's second single, it reached the top twenty of the German and Swiss Single Chart.

== Track listings ==
All tracks produced by Marek Pompetzki and Paul NZA.

CD single
No.	Title	Writer(s)	Length
1.	"Like a Bullet" (album version)	Niara Scarlett; Jens Bergmark; Henrik Korpi; Mattias Franzen	2:28
2.	"Like a Bullet" (instrumental)	Scarlett; Bergmark; Korpi; Franzen	2:29
3.	"Superstition"	Stevie Wonder	3:27
4.	"I Wrote the Book"	Steve Lee; Tim Laws	3:31

== Charts ==
Weekly chart performance for "Like a Bullet"
Chart (2008)	Peak position
Austria (Ö3 Austria Top 40)	53
Germany (GfK)	29
Switzerland (Schweizer Hitparade)	27
