= Diggin' in the Dirt =

Single by Stefanie Heinzmann

from the album Stefanie Heinzmann
- Released: 17 February 2012
- Recorded: Tinseltown Music Studios (Cologne)
- Length: 3:33
- Label: Universal Domestic Pop
- Songwriters: Martin Fliegenschmidt; Claudio Pagonis; Matthias Hass; Herbie Crichlow
- Producers: Martin Fliegenschmidt; Claudio Pagonis; Kiko Masbaum

Stefanie Heinzmann singles chronology
"Roots to Grow" (2010)	"Diggin' in the Dirt" (2012)	"Show Me the Way" (2012)

"Diggin' in the Dirt" is a song by Swiss recording artist Stefanie Heinzmann. It was written by Martin Fliegenschmidt, Claudio Pagonis, Matthias Hass, and Herbie Crichlow, while production was overseen by Fliegenschmidt, Pagonis and Kiko Masbaum. The song was released as the first single from her third self-titled album, Stefanie Heinzmann (2012) and became a top ten hit in Switzerland. The song featured on Just Dance 4.

== Background ==
"Diggin' in the Dirt" was written by Martin Fliegenschmidt, Claudio Pagonis, Matthias Hass, and Herbie Crichlow and originated at a songwriting camp in Cologne, held to curate tracks for Heinzmann's third studio album. Production on the track was overseen by Fliegenschmidt, Pagonis, and Kiko Masbaum. Lyrically, the song describes Heinzmann's journey from psychiatric care to a carefree and happy life.

== Chart performance ==
"Diggin' in the Dirt" would become Heinzmann's biggest-selling since her debut with "My Man Is a Mean Man" (2008). In Switzerland, the song debuted at number seven on the Swiss Singles Chart, for the issue dated 4 March 2012. In second week, the single dropped to number 16, but eventually reached a new peak at number six in its third week. Still in 2012, "Diggin' in the Dirt" was certified platinum by the International Federation of the Phonographic Industry (IFPI).

== Music video ==
A music video for "Diggin' in the Dirt" was directed by Sandra Marschner and produced by Gernot Jurisch-Navarro for Katapult Filmproduktion. The visuals shows, from a first-person perspective, the fate of a city dweller who gets involved with shady characters while trying to buy drugs.

== Track listings ==
Digital single
No.	Title	Writer(s)	Producer(s)	Length
1.	"Diggin' in the Dirt"	Matthias Hass; Claudio Pagonis; Herbie Crichlow; Martin Fliegenschmidt	Kiko Masbaum; Pagonis; Fliegenschmidt	3:33
2.	"Old Flame"	Marek Pompetzki; Paul NZA; Cecil Remmler; Julie Frost	Pompetzki; NZA; Remmler	3:46
3.	"Diggin' in the Dirt"	music video		3:39

CD single
No.	Title	Writer(s)	Producer(s)	Length
1.	"Diggin' in the Dirt"	Hass; Pagonis; Crichlow; Fliegenschmidt	Masbaum; Pagonis; Fliegenschmidt	3:33
2.	"Old Flame"	Pompetzki; NZA; Remmler; Frost	Pompetzki; NZA; Remmler	3:46

== Charts ==
=== Weekly charts ===
Weekly chart performance for "Diggin' in the Dirt"
Chart (2012)	Peak position
Austria (Ö3 Austria Top 40)	29
Germany (GfK)	12
Switzerland (Schweizer Hitparade)	6

=== Year-end charts ===
Year-end chart performance for "Diggin' in the Dirt"
Chart (2012)	Position
Germany (GfK)	100
Switzerland (Schweizer Hitparade)	61

== Certifications ==
Certifications for "Diggin' in the Dirt"
Region	Certification	Certified units/sales
Germany (BVMI)	Gold	150,000^{‡}
Switzerland (IFPI Switzerland)	Platinum	30,000^{^}
^{^} Shipments figures based on certification alone.^{‡} Sales+streaming figures based on certification alone.
