= In the End (Stefanie Heinzmann song) =

Single by Stefanie Heinzmann

from the album Chance of Rain
- Released: 5 March 2015
- Length: 3:22
- Label: Universal Music Domestic
- Songwriter(s): Edvard Førre Erfjord; Stefanie Heinzmann; Henrik Michelsen; Sam Romans
- Producer(s): Electric

Stefanie Heinzmann singles chronology
"Show Me the Way" (2012)	"In the End" (2015)	"On Fire" (2015)

"In the End" is a song by Swiss recording artist Stefanie Heinzmann. It was written by Heinzmann along with Edvard Førre Erfjord, Henrik Barman Michelsen, and Sam Romans for her fourth studio album Chance of Rain (2015), with production helmed by Erfjord and Michelsen under their production moniker Electric. Selected as the album's first single, "In the End" peaked at number nine on the Swiss Albums Chart, becoming Heinzmann's third domestic top ten hit, and reached the top thirty in Germany.

== Charts ==
Weekly chart performance for "In the End"
Chart (2015)	Peak position
Austria (Ö3 Austria Top 40)	67
Germany (GfK)	25
Switzerland (Schweizer Hitparade)	9
