= Masterplan (Stefanie Heinzmann album) =

Studio album by Stefanie Heinzmann
- Released: 7 March 2008
- Recorded: Various: Numarek Studios (Berlin, Germany); Ten Studios (Stockholm, Sweden)
- Length: 49:24
- Label: Polydor; Universal
- Producer: Grizzly; Paul NZA; Marek Pompetzki; Markus Sepehrmanesh; Tommy Tysper

Stefanie Heinzmann chronology
Masterplan (2008)	Roots to Grow (2009)

Singles from Masterplan
- 1. "My Man Is a Mean Man" Released: 11 January 2008; 2. "Like a Bullet" Released: 18 April 2008; 3. "Revolution" Released: 1 August 2008; 4. "The Unforgiven" Released: 31 October 2008

Masterplan is debut studio album by Swiss singer Stefanie Heinzmann. It was released by Universal Music Domestic on 7 March 2008 in German-speaking Europe, after she won the television talent contest SSDSDSSWEMUGABRTLAD on the ProSieben late-nigh show TV total. Recorded within just two week, the album was mainly produced by Paul NZA and Marek Pompetzki, with additional production from Tommy Tysper and Gustav "Grizzly" Jonsson. Musically, Masterplan is a pop album with strong influences from soul and funk, largely shaped by Heinzmann's song choices during the competition performances.

Critics commended Masterplan for Heinzmann’s vocal performance and its authentic 1970s-inspired sound, describing it as a competent debut, though some noted a lack of innovation and that it did not fully realize her artistic potential. Commercially, the album became one of the biggest debuts of the year, reaching number one in Switzerland and the top five in Austria and Germany, while eventually going Platinum in Switzerland and Germany. In November 2008, a deluxe edition of the album was released, including the previously unreleased single "The Unforgiven" by Metallica, a cover version of Stevie Wonder's "Superstition", a B-side and two remix versions.

== Background ==
In mid–2007, her brother convinced Heinzmann to take part in Stefan Raab's talent contest SSDSDSSWEMUGABRTLAD, organised by commercial television channel ProSieben for his daily late-nigh show TV total. She was picked as one of the 20 contestants for the show, and with her interpretations of soul, jazz and funk classics by the likes of Macy Gray, Norah Jones and Joss Stone, she managed to qualify for the final show on 10 January 2008. There, Heinzmann performed two songs, "Only So Much Oil in the Ground," a Tower of Power cover, and "My Man Is a Mean Man," which was specifically selected for her. Through televoting, the audience chose Heinzmann as the winner of the show, beating the two remaining contestants, Steffi List and Gregor Meyle. As a result of her win, Heinzmann signed with Universal Records Domestic Division and began work on her debut album Masterplan.

== Critical reception ==
Professional ratings
Review scores
Source	Rating
CDStarts	7/10
laut.de	1/5 stars
LetMeEntertainYou	3/5 marks
Pooltrax	4/5 stars
MusicHeadQuarter	9/10

CDStarts editor Matthias Reichel concluded that, by comparison, the work had become "something truly remarkable." He found that the producers "made a smart move by choosing soulful pop songs in a 1970s style for [Heinzmann] — a perfect match for her voice. Whether driving, groovy, or ballad-like, the Swiss singer always hits the mark with her vocal performance. Emotional or full-on soul power – the listener immediately senses where this young artist's strengths lie — and the compositions support her at a consistently good to very good level." MusicHeadQuarter felt that Masterplan "fully delivers on the promise Stefanie made with her earlier performances and debut single, and it's unlikely to disappoint her fans. A confident debut and a worthwhile listen for anyone with eclectic musical tastes." Nina Hortig from Monsters & Critics called the album a "lively, refined, and above all, authentic funk record, full of character and soul."

Susanne Lang, writing for Bild, found that while Masterplan "doesn't always fully succeed, it is nevertheless worth hearing. This is entirely due to Heinzmann's voice, from which great things are yet to come." LetMeEntertainYou concluded that "all in all, the album turns out to be surprisingly good for a talent show winner with strong vocals, but only average when viewed more broadly," while Pooltraxx wrote: "Despite her evident talent, Heinzmann doesn't quite live up to her full potential on this debut. Including one of those spine-tingling moments from the talent show finals would have been a smart move. Instead, she floats somewhere between a hesitant Janis Joplin and a watered-down Earth, Wind & Fire." Less impressed, Moritz Enninger from laut.de found that "innovation was mostly nowhere to be found" on Masterplan and that it "was not safe from mainstream pop and boredom."

== Chart performance ==
In Switzerland, Masterplan debuted at number-one on the Swiss Albums Chart. It spent seven weeks in the chart’s top ten and a total of forty weeks on the chart. Still in 2008, the album was certified platinum by the International Federation of the Phonographic Industry (IFPI) for shipments figures of more than 30,000 copies. Media Control ranked the album 17th on its Swiss year-end chart. In Germany, the album opened and peaked at number three on the German Albums Chart It was eventually certified platinum by the Bundesverband Musikindustrie (BVMI) as well, for shipping 200,000 copies. In Austria, Masterplan reached the top five of the Austrian Albums Chart.

== Track listing ==
Masterplan track listing
No.	Title	Writer(s)	Producer(s)	Length
1.	"Masterplan"	Steve Lee; Hannah Robinson; James Manners; Silje Haugum Nymoen	Marek Pompetzki; Paul NZA	3:22
2.	"My Man Is a Mean Man"	Tommy Tysper; Marcus Sepehrmanesh; Pauline Olofsson	Tysper; Gustav "Grizzly" Jonsson; Sepehrmanesh^{[A]}	3:32
3.	"Like a Bullet"	Niara Scarlett; Jens Bergmark; Henrik Korpi; Mattias Franzen	Pompetzki; NZA	2:28
4.	"Can't Get You Out of My System"	unknown	Pompetzki; NZA	3:15
5.	"I Betcha She Doesn't Feel It"	Blair MacKichan	Pompetzki; NZA	2:57
6.	"Don't Call This Love"	Chris Braide; Carl Falk; Bryn Christopher	Pompetzki; NZA	2:59
7.	"Revolution"	Joby Baker; Alexandria Maillot; Amanda Maillot	Pompetzki; NZA	2:42
8.	"Free Love"	Goldie; Jay Jay; Negin Djafari	Pompetzki; NZA	3:06
9.	"If I Don't Love You Now"	Will Simms; Stuart Pridel	Pompetzki; NZA	3:06
10.	"Painfully Easy"	Andreas Jensen; Julia Coles	Pompetzki; NZA	4:39
11.	"Best Thing You Ever Did"	Diane Warren	Pompetzki; NZA	3:25
12.	"Only So Much Oil in the Ground" (featuring Tower of Power)	Emilio Castillo; Stephen Kupka	Pompetzki; NZA	3:27
13.	"Do Your Thing"	Dean Krippaehne	Pompetzki; NZA	2:26
14.	"Xtal" (with Claudio Heinzmann)	Stefanie Heinzmann; Claudio Heinzmann	Pompetzki; NZA	3:14
Total length:				49:24

Deluxe edition bonus tracks
No.	Title	Writer(s)	Producer(s)	Length
15.	"The Unforgiven"	James Hetfield; Lars Ulrich; Kirk Hammett	Pompetzki; NZA	3:33
16.	"Superstition"	Stevie Wonder	Pompetzki; NZA	3:27
17.	"I Wrote the Book"	Steve Lee; Tim Laws	Pompetzki; NZA	3:31
18.	"Only So Much Oil in the Ground" (Live with Tower of Power)	Castillo; Kupka		3:27
19.	"Like a Bullet" (Mozart & Friends Unplugged Remix)	Scarlett; Bergmark; Korpi; Franze	Pompetzki; NZA; Mozart & Friends^{[A]}	2:28
Total length:				63:12

Notes

- ^{^[A]} denotes co-producer

== Credits and personnel ==
Performers and musicians

- Chris Bruce – bass guitar
- Earl Harvin – cymbal, drums
- Vanessa Mason – backing vocals
- Paul NZA – various instruments
- Marek Pompetzki – various instruments
- Kim Sanders – backing vocals
- Sebastian Studnitzky – brass
- Tobias Thiele – guitar

Technical

- Paul NZA – engineering
- Marek Pompetzki – engineering, mixing
- Reinsberg.de – artwork
- Michael Zargarinejad – photography

== Charts ==
=== Weekly charts ===
Weekly chart performance for Masterplan
Chart (2008)	Peak position
Austrian Albums (Ö3 Austria)	5
German Albums (Offizielle Top 100)	3
Swiss Albums (Schweizer Hitparade)	1

=== Year-end charts ===
Year-end chart performance for Masterplan
Chart (2008)	Position
German Albums (Official Top 100)	27
Swiss Albums (Schweizer Hitparade)	17

== Certifications ==
Certifications for Masterplan
Region	Certification	Certified units/sales
Germany (BVMI)	Platinum	200,000^{^}
Switzerland (IFPI Switzerland)	Platinum	30,000^{^}
^{^} Shipments figures based on certification alone.

== Release history ==
Release dates and formats for Masterplan
Region	Date	Editions	Formats	Labels	Refs.
Austria	7 March 2008	Standard	Digital download; CD	Polydor; Universal Music Domestic Pop	
Germany	7 March 2008	Standard	Digital download; CD	Polydor; Universal Music Domestic Pop	
Switzerland	7 March 2008	Standard	Digital download; CD	Polydor; Universal Music Domestic Pop	
Austria	14 November 2008	Deluxe	Digital download; CD	Polydor; Universal Music Domestic Pop	
Germany	14 November 2008	Deluxe	Digital download; CD	Polydor; Universal Music Domestic Pop	
Switzerland	14 November 2008	Deluxe	Digital download; CD	Polydor; Universal Music Domestic Pop	
Poland	24 July 2009	Standard	Digital download; CD	Universal Music Group	
