= My Man Is a Mean Man =

Single by Stefanie Heinzmann

from the album Masterplan
- Released: January 11, 2008
- Length: Universal Music Domestic
- Songwriter(s): Tommy Tysper; Marcus Sepehrmanesh; Pauline Olofsson
- Producer(s): Gustav "Grizzly" Jonsson; Tysper

Stefanie Heinzmann singles chronology
"My Man Is a Mean Man" (2008)	"Like a Bullet" (2008)

"My Man Is a Mean Man" is a song by Swiss recording artist Stefanie Heinzmann, the winner of the TV Total television competition SSDSDSSWEMUGABRTLAD. It was written by Tommy Tysper, Marcus Sepehrmanesh, and Pauline Olofsson, while production was helmed by the former along with Gustav "Grizzly" Jonsson. Heinzmann's recording was picked as her coronation song and debut single. Upon its release, it debuted at number-one on the Swiss Singles Chart and became a top ten hit in Austria and Germany. The song was later included on her debut album, Masterplan (2008).

== Music video ==
A music video for "My Man Is a Mean Man" was directed by Frank Paul Husmann-Labusga and Manfred Winkens.

== Track listings ==
CD single
No.	Title	Writer(s)	Producer(s)	Length
1.	"My Man Is a Mean Man"	Tommy Tysper; Marcus Sepehrmanesh; Pauline Olofsson	Gustav "Grizzly" Jonsson; Tysper	3:33
2.	"Stefanie Heinzmann Desktop-Player"

== Charts ==
=== Weekly charts ===
Weekly chart performance for "My Man Is a Mean Man"
Chart (2008)	Peak position
Austria (Ö3 Austria Top 40)	6
Germany (GfK)	3
Switzerland (Schweizer Hitparade)	1

=== Year-end charts ===
Year-end chart performance for "My Man Is a Mean Man"
Chart (2008)	Position
Austria (Ö3 Austria Top 40)	42
Germany (GfK)	11
Switzerland (Schweizer Hitparade)	12

== Certifications ==
Certifications for "My Man Is a Mean Man"
Region	Certification	Certified units/sales
Germany (BVMI)	Gold	150,000^{^}
^{^} Shipments figures based on certification alone.
