= Alexandria Maillot =

Canadian actress, singer and songwriter

- Born: Vancouver, British Columbia, Canada
- Genres: Singer songwriter; Pop
- Occupations: Singer; songwriter; actor
- Instruments: Vocals; guitar; keys
- Years active: 2012–present
- Label: ramonrecords.ca
- Website: www.maillotmusic.com

Alexandria Maillot is a Canadian actor, singer and songwriter. They were born in 1992 and are most known for their music career, as well as their role as Lucie in the 2011 Canadian romance horror film Red Riding Hood.

== Life and career ==
Alexandria Maillot was born in Prince George, British Columbia. After moving to Vancouver Island as a child, they began playing music and starting to sing at the age of seven. At the age of 16, they took part in the 2009 Peak Performance Project, an artist development program curated by radio station 102.7 The Peak.

On June 10, 2016, they released their debut full-length album Time, featuring the single "Sunday Sara".

Over 2017, Alexandria Maillot recorded in Montreal, Quebec with producer Samuel Woywitka. They released the single "Make It Out" on September 14, 2018. Their follow up single "Messed It Up", released November 9, 2018, garnered attention across Canada, including airplay on The Verge (XM).

Throughout 2019, they toured extensively, including appearances at Reeperbahn Festival in Hamburg, Germany, Halifax Pop Explosion, and a cross Canada tour supporting Louise Burns. In the fall of 2019, they announced their sophomore record Benevolence. It was officially released on November 22, 2019, and garnered praise from outlets like CBC Q, Exclaim!, and Earmilk. They are non-binary and use they/them pronouns.

== Discography ==
=== Studio albums ===
- Just Another Girl (EP) (June 22, 2012)
- Time (June 10, 2016)
- Benevolence (November 22, 2019)

=== Singles ===
- "Sunday Sara" (April 15, 2016)
- "Make It Out" (September 14, 2018)
- "Messed It Up" (November 9, 2018)
- "The Judge" (September 27, 2019)

== Filmography ==
=== Film ===
| Year | Title | Role |
|---|---|---|
| 2011 | Red Riding Hood | Lucie |
| 2019 | Where's Amanda? | Amanda's Sister |

== Awards and nominations ==
| Year | Organization | Award | Work or author awarded | Result |
|---|---|---|---|---|
| 2020 | Western Canadian Music Awards | Breakout Artist of the Year | Alexandria Maillot | Nominated |
| 2020 | Western Canadian Music Awards | Pop Artist of the Year | Alexandria Maillot | Nominated |
