= TV total =

German late-night television comedy talk show

- Genre: Late-night talk show Variety show
- Created by: Stefan Raab
- Developed by: Raab TV
- Presented by: Sebastian Pufpaff
- Theme music composer: Stefan Raab
- Opening theme: "TV total Theme 2003" by Stefan Raab
- Country of origin: Germany
- Original language: German
- No. of seasons: 20
- No. of episodes: 2398

Production
- Producer: Florian Göbels
- Production location: Cologne
- Running time: approx. 45 min.
- Production company: Brainpool TV

Original release
- Network: ProSieben
- Release: 8 March 1999

Related
- Wok racing Bundesvision Song Contest; Schlag den Raab

TV total is a long-running German late-night television comedy talk show created by Stefan Raab and broadcast on ProSieben. The show originally aired for nearly 17 years from 1999 to 2015, hosted by Raab and produced by Raab TV, which became a subsidiary of Brainpool TV. Following a six-year hiatus, it was revived in 2021 with Sebastian Pufpaff as host.

== Concept and history ==
TV total focused in particular on mocking the funniest moments from other shows on German television; it also presented Raab in reports and challenges taking place inside and outside of the studio, and interviewing national and international celebrity guests. Notable guests were the bands Red Hot Chili Peppers, Green Day, Linkin Park, Coldplay, Morten Harket, Adam Green, U2, Keane, Oasis, Metallica, and Manowar, martial-arts star Jackie Chan, Kevin Costner, 50 Cent, Eminem, D12, Mark Wahlberg, Jack Black, Jon Bon Jovi, Ewan McGregor, Dwayne Johnson, Janet Jackson, Rihanna, Jay-Z, Alicia Keys, t.A.T.u., Tokio Hotel, Justin Bieber, Psy, Sting, Paris Hilton, and Kylie Minogue.

Episodes of TV total were recorded in a studio in Cologne in the afternoon before an audience of around 250 people and televised a few hours later at night. The show's set included a mobile interview stage that could be moved from one side of the studio to the other. A large desk on that stage contained buttons with hilarious sounds and video clips before Craig Ferguson's The Late Late Show (CBS TV series). The show had its own band, the Heavytones, and most of the guest musicians and comedians regularly performed live on stage.

TV total was broadcast once a week (on a Monday) from its beginning in 1999 to February 2001 and usually four times per week (Monday to Thursday) from March 2001 to the cancellation of the show in December 2015. The show paused during the summer for up to two months. Special episodes were produced occasionally. Notable examples included live episodes that emphasized soccer during the FIFA World Cup 2002 and 2006 and the Euro 2004, live episodes from New York when Raab and his team visited the Super Bowl XVIII, one episode that summarized the most recent calendar year shortly before Christmas, New Year's Eve Specials, and up to six episodes per year that featured Raab and other celebrities playing Texas Hold'em.

In February 2001, Elton started as Raab's intern and sidekick and had frequent appearances on the show, for example as a quizmaster for the weekly rubric Blamieren oder Kassieren (literally: to blunder or to cash).

In 2006, Stefan Raab managed to start a new talent contest that was shown as a bonus within his TV total show. This was named "SSDSGPS" (acronym for: Stefan sucht den Super-Grand-Prix-Star, meaning Stefan seeks the Super Grand-Prix Star) and only had a total of four attendees; this was a mock on the acronym DSDS for the German version of Pop Idol running on RTL. The winner of the show, a German singer named Max Mutzke, then performed at the Eurovision Song Contest for Germany. Though he only made it to the eighth position, he later became a quite successful singer and artist in Germany and Austria. The show later had another singing competition that finally carried it to extremes – Raab's talent contest SSDSDSSWEMUGABRTLAD (acronym for: Stefan sucht den Superstar, der singen soll, was er möchte, und gerne auch bei RTL auftreten darf, meaning: "Stefan seeks the Superstar who shall sing what he wants and who may perform on RTL if he likes") was meant as a mock on RTL Television. He created it when Deutschland sucht den Superstar candidate Max Buskohl accepted an invitation to appear in TV total after he left the show in April 2007 but was denied this performance by RTL who cited their existing contract. Raab then started a campaign called Freiheit für Max Buskohl ("Freedom for Max Buskohl") that got attention for using an edited RAF kidnapping photo. After this campaign failed he started his new casting show. The winner was Stefanie Heinzmann. Raab self-deprecates himself by insulting RTL within the show.

From 2 February until 12 March 2010, the TV-broadcasters ProSieben and Das Erste (ARD) collaborated to find Germany's entry for the Eurovision Song Contest 2010. After eight Unser Star für Oslo-Shows, Lena Meyer-Landrut was voted to represent Germany at the Eurovision Song Contest 2010, where she won with 246 points, marking Germany's second victory at the competition after Nicole had won in 1982. Lena Meyer-Landrut also represented Germany in the Eurovision Song Contest 2011 taking place in Düsseldorf, where she finished tenth.

Raab announced his retirement from show business on 17 June 2015. The final episode was broadcast on 16 December 2015. It featured Raab and Elton reminiscing about the history of the show and concluded with Raab and Elton exiting the studio waving towards the audience. Raab made his public return in 2024 on the TV-broadcaster RTL where he presented the show Du gewinnst hier nicht die Million (2024-2025) and Die Stefan Raab Show (since 2025), where he used the stil and concept of TV total again and created an inofficial spin-off of his old show.

== Criticism ==
TV total was criticized multiple times by the media, mostly because of the exposure of (mostly random and inexperienced) people to mockery. German tabloid paper Bild called Raab the "evil of German TV" after he had edited a kidnapping photo of the former German terrorist organization Red Army Faction for a campaign of one of his casting shows. German politician Wolfgang Bosbach thought TV total's ratings largely depended on the amount of "trash" depicted in the show. In a 2015 review, Der Spiegel journalist Jonas Leppin summarized that the TV total's current nature was missing the humor and creativity of the first years of the show and Raab had lost most of his dedication, which ultimately caused the ratings to drop below the 1 million mark. TV total and Raab himself were subject to a couple of lawsuits.
