= Stefanie Heinzmann =

Swiss singer

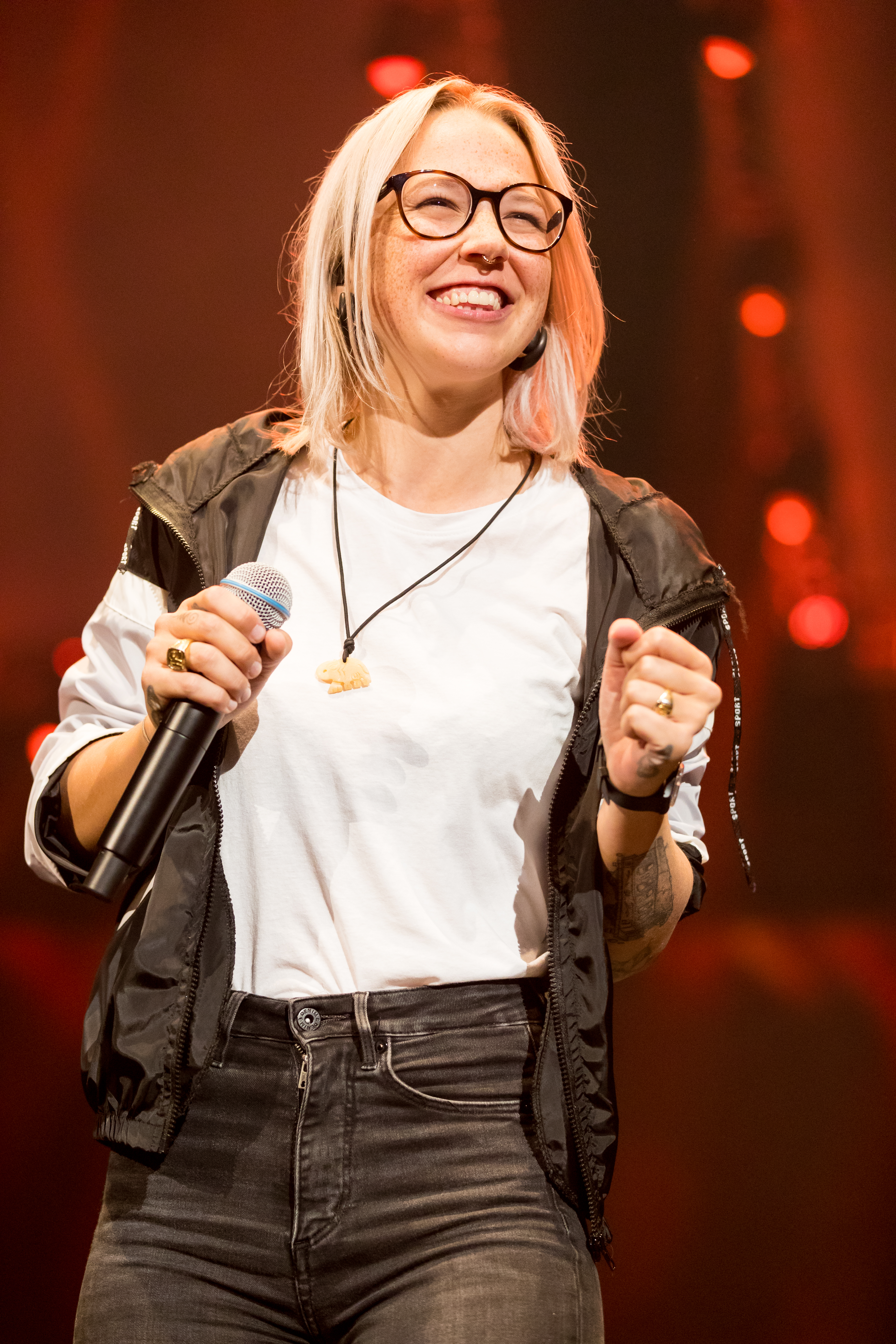
- Heinzmann in 2018

Background information
- Born: Stefanie Fabienne Heinzmann; 10 March 1989 (age 37); Visp, Valais, Switzerland
- Genres: Soul, funk, pop
- Occupation: Singer
- Years active: 2005-present
- Labels: Universal Music, BMG
- Website: StefanieHeinzmann.de

Stefanie Fabienne Heinzmann (born 10 March 1989) is a Swiss pop singer and television personality. She gained public interest in early 2008 when she won SSDSDSSWEMUGABRTLAD, a talent contest hosted in Stefan Raab's late-night-show TV total on the German ProSieben network. Following her win, Heinzmann released her debut single "My Man is a mean Man", which debuted straight atop the Swiss Singles Chart and became a top ten hit in Austria and Germany. Her pop-soul-influenced album Masterplan was released in March 2008 and made it to the top ten in Austria and Germany, also reaching number one in Switzerland, where it was certified platinum by the IFPI for more than 30,000 copies sold.

Heinzmann followed this with a series of successful albums, including the chart toppers Roots to grow (2009), Stefanie Heinzmann (2012), Chance of Rain (2015), and All we need is Love (2019), all of which entered the top five in Switzerland. Several singles from these albums became top-ten-hits on the pop-charts throughout German-speaking Europe, including "The Unforgiven", "Diggin' in the Dirt", and "In the End". One of the best-selling Swiss artists to emerge in the late 2000s, Heinzmann has won several high-profile prizes as a recording artist such as Prix Walo, the 1LIVE Krone, a Comet, a Swiss Music Award, the Radio Regenbogen Award, and the 2009 ECHO Award. Beyond her music career, Heinzmann has been featured as a coach on two seasons of the reality competition television series The Voice of Switzerland, the talent series Popstars, the music game show The Masked Singer, and Sing meinen Song - Das schweizer Tauschkonzert.

== Early life and career beginnings ==
Heinzmann was born in Visp in the canton of Valais in Switzerland. She is the only daughter of Berti and Albi Heinzmann-Martig, and younger sister of Claudio Heinzmann, a music manager and singer-songwriter on his own. Heinzmann attended the commercial school for athletes and artists at the Kollegium Brig.

In 2005, she started her music career as the lead singer of the rock band Bigfisch. Their first single "Chumm ins Wallis" (Swiss German for "Come to Valais") became a local airplay success and was voted "Biggest Valais Hit of the Year" by local radio station Radio Rottu Oberwallis (RRO) in 2007. In summer 2007, her brother convinced Heinzmann to take part in Stefan Raab's talent contest SSDSDSSWEMUGABRTLAD, organized by commercial television channel ProSieben. She was picked as one of the 20 contestants for the show, and with her interpretations of soul, jazz, and funk classics by the likes of Macy Gray, Norah Jones, and Joss Stone, she managed to qualify for the final show on 10 January 2008. There, Heinzmann performed two songs, "Only so much Oil in the Ground", a Tower of Power cover, and "My Man is a mean Man," which was specifically selected for her. Through televoting, the audience chose Heinzmann as the winner of the show, beating the two remaining contestants, Steffi List and Gregor Meyle. The music video for "My Man is a mean Man" was shot during the night of the final and premiered on German television channels days later.

== Recording career ==
=== 2008-2011: Masterplan and Roots to Grow ===
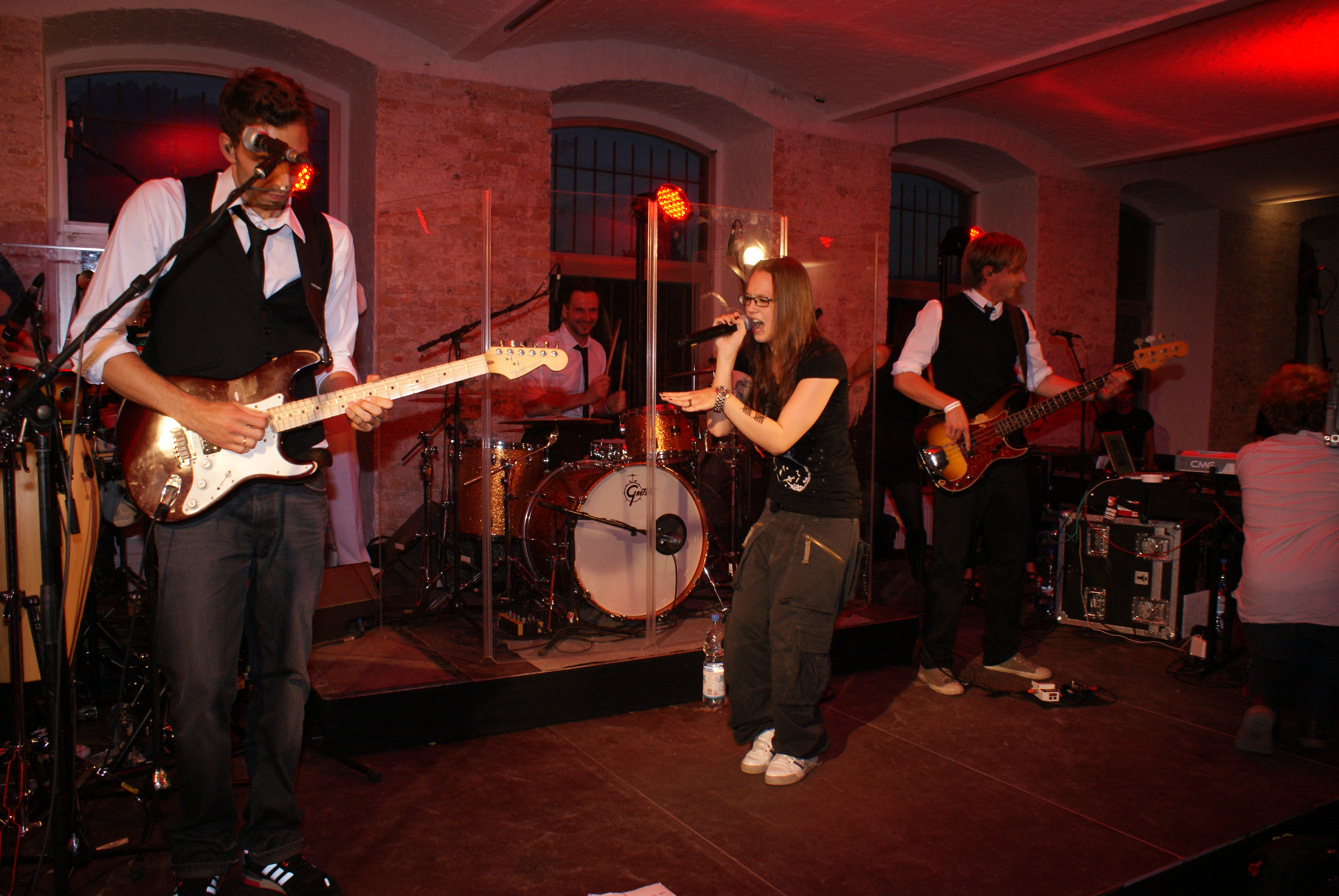
Heinzmann performing at her record release party in Berlin in 2009

Heinzmann's competition song "My Man is a mean Man" went on sale the day after the final. The single went straight to the top of the Swiss Singles Chart and reached the top ten in Austria and Germany, where it became a successful airplay hit during the following months, and established Heinzmann as one of the biggest-selling newcomers of the year. The song was eventually certified platinum in Germany by the Bundesverband Musikindustrie (BVMI) as well. Her first album, Masterplan, primarily produced by Paul NZA and Marek Pompetzki, was released on 7 March 2008, throughout German-speaking Europe. Like the single, it peaked within the top ten in Austria and Germany, and debuted at number-one in the Swiss Albums Chart, where it was eventually certified platinum for more than 30,000 copies sold. Altogether, Masterplan sold more than 300,000 copies Europe-wide, and earned the singer several prizes such as the Prix Walo, the 1LIVE Krone, a Comet, a Swiss Music Award, and the 2009 ECHO Award for Best Female Artist National Rock/Pop. A reissue of the album was released on 19 November 2008 and included the previously unreleased song "The Unforgiven", a Metallica cover which became her second top ten hit in Germany.

In support of the album, Heinzmann embarked on a festival concert tour from May until September 2008, visiting venues throughout Germany and Switzerland. In May 2008, Heinzmann and her brother founded heinzmann-productions GmbH. Claudio serves as the chairman of the board, while Stefanie is incorporated as the company's official CEO. In September 2009, Heinzmann's second album Roots to Grow was released. The singer re-teamed with production duo NZA and Pompetzki to work on the majority of the album, which features songwriting credits by Joss Stone, Rick Nowels, Guy Chambers, Lucie Silvas, SoShy, and Bryn Christopher, as well as collaborations with singers such as Gentleman and Ronan Keating. Upon its release, Roots to Grow reached number four on the Swiss Albums Chart and made it to the top twenty in Germany, but was less successful than its predecessor Masterplan (2008). Leading single "No One (can ever change my Mind)" peaked at number twenty-seven on the Swiss Singles Chart.

=== 2012-2017: Third album and Chance of Rain ===
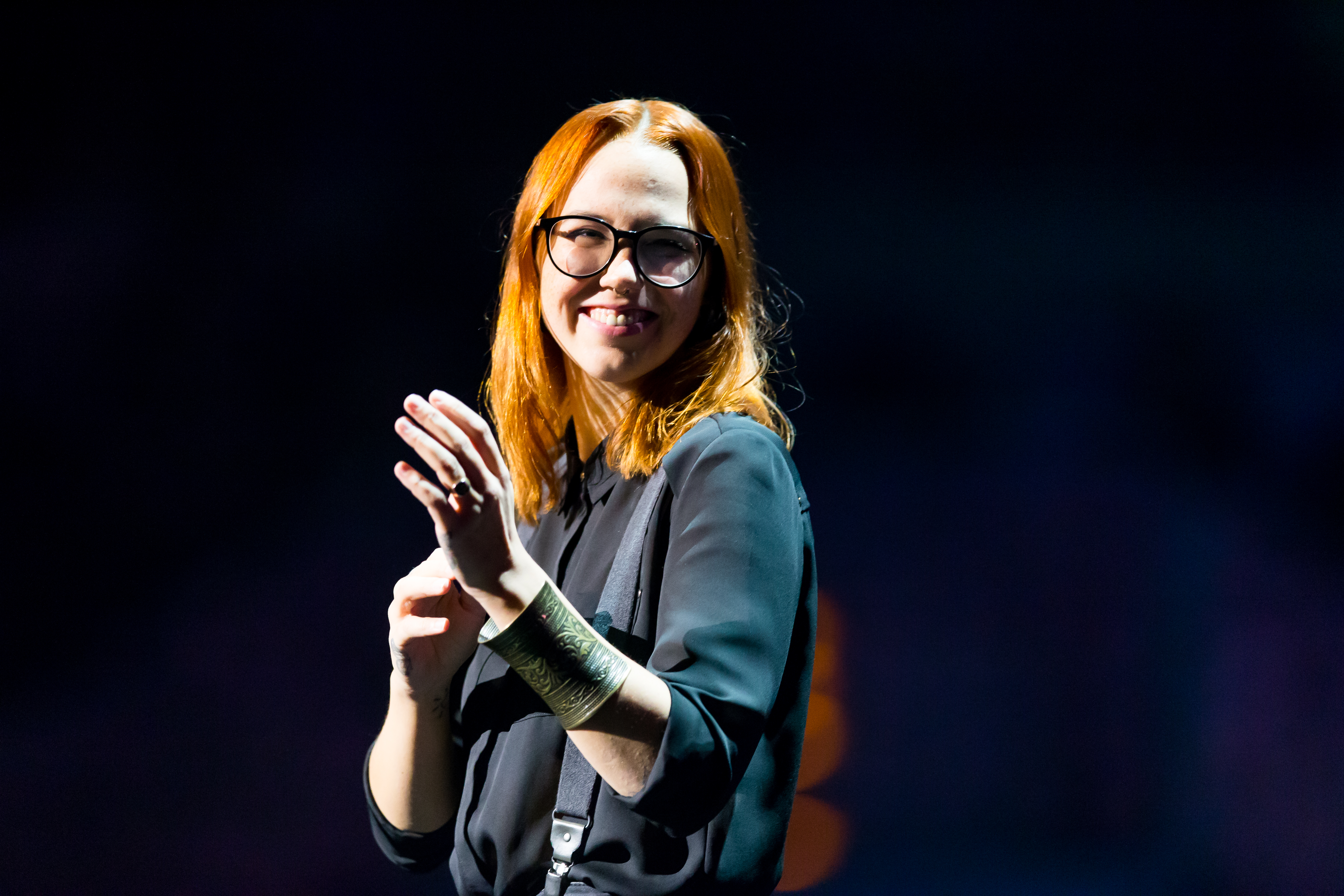
Heinzmann during her Night of the Proms performance at the SAP Arena in Mannheim in November 2016

Heinzmann began work on her self-titled third studio album in 2010. Following the rushed recordings of her previous albums, the singer welcomed the opportunity to take a bigger role in the production of the album, for which she co-wrote or conceptualized several songs. Again, she re-teamed with NZA and Pompetzki to work on the album, also involving contribution from singers and songwriters Eric Bazilian, Julie Frost, Jamie Cullum, Ian Dench, Alice Smith, Sharon Vaughn, and Kim Sanders. Released on 16 March 2012 in German-speaking Europe, Stefanie Heinzmann debuted at number three on the Swiss Singles Chart, and reached the top ten in Germany as well as the top 30 in Austria. The album's first offering, lead single "Diggin' in the Dirt", became her highest-charting single in years, reaching number six in Switzerland, where the song became her first top ten since "My Man Is a Mean Man." Also 2012, it was announced that Heinzmann would join the jury of the debut season of the SRF 1 reality talent show The Voice of Switzerland in 2013.

In 2015, Heinzmann released her fourth album Chance of Rain. The album marked a departure from her previous work, with Heinzmann collaborating with Berlin production team Beatgees and Swedish duo Electric on most of the album. Critics noted that the overall sound of Chance of Rain deviated from the pop soul sounds on her previous projects, particularly on electro pop ballads such as "Stranger in This World." Though it failed to chart on the Austrian Albums Chart, Chance of Rain became her fourth consecutive top five album in Switzerland, where it debuted and peaked at number four and remained 39 weeks on the Swiss Albums Chart. It also reached the top twenty of the German Albums Chart. Lead single "In the End" became Heinzmann's third top ten hit and highest-charting single since "Diggin' in the Dirt", reaching number nine on the Swiss Singles Chart. In May 2015, Heinzmann along with singer Miss Platnum and dancer Bella Garcia joined the jury of the German revival of the RTL II network talent series Popstars which tracked the making of the short-living girl group Leandah. Also that year, Heinzmann was awarded the MTV Europe Music Award for Best Swiss Act.

=== 2018-2020: All We Need Is Love and talent series ===
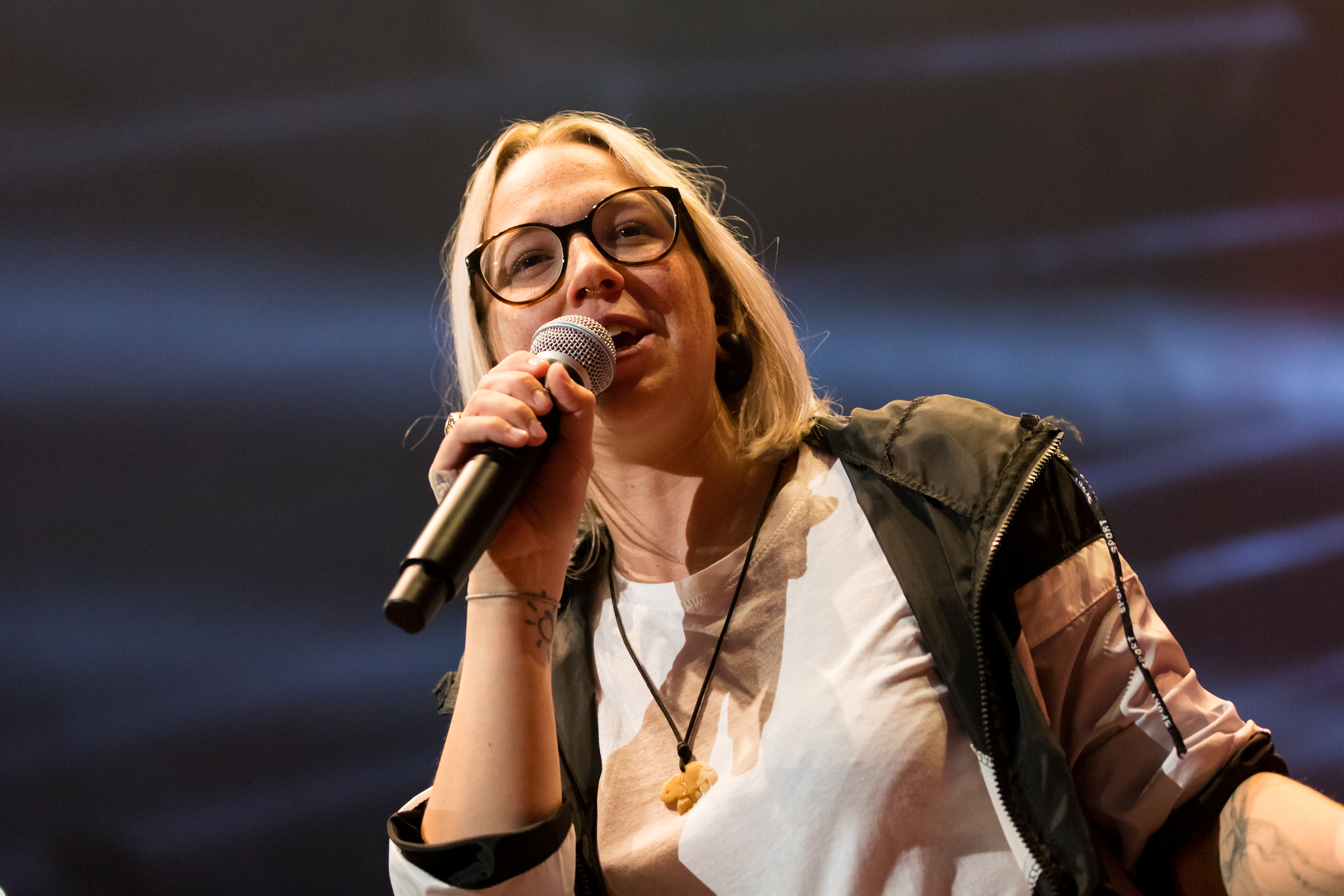
Heinzmann at the 30 Jahre Radio Regenbogen in Mannheim in 2018

In September 2018, Heinzmann released the single "Build a House", a collaboration with German DJ and producer Alle Farben. Taking Heinzmann's further into the dance pop genre, it reached the top forty of the Swiss Singles Chart and preceded her fifth studio album All We Need Is Love for which she consulted producers Steffen Graef, John Gordon, and Sune Haansbæk to work with her. Released on 22 March 2019 through BMG Rights Management, It became Heinzmann's first album to top the Swiss Albums Chart since her 2008 debut album Masterplan. The album produced three singles, including lead single "Mother's Heart" and follow-up "Shadows," all of which failed to chart but received radio airplay. In November 2019, she embarked on her All We Need Is Love Tour, a 15-date concert tour that took her again to Switzerland, Austria, and Germany. Three months later, she won Best Female Act at the 13th Swiss Music Awards.

In February 2020, Heinzmann along with Seven, Francine Jordi, Ritschi, Marc Storace, Steff la Cheffe, and Loco Escrito appeared on the debut season of the reality television series Sing meinen Song - Das Schweizer Tauschkonzert, the Swiss version of The Best Singers series. Broadcast on TV24, its episodes were filmed on Gran Canaria, prior to social distancing and the COVID-19 pandemic. An accompanying compilation album, including five of Heinzmann's live renditions, reached the top of the Swiss Albums Chart. The following month, Heinzmann participated as Dalmatiner in the second season of the German adaption of the singing competition The Masked Singer. Her debut performance of Marilyn Monroe's "Diamonds Are a Girl's Best Friend" placed last, resulting in her elimination at the end of the first episode. In May 2020, she represented Switzerland with her song "All We Need Is Love" in the Free European Song Contest, a one-off music competition in the Eurovision format, organized by the ProSieben network, serving as an alternative for the Eurovision Song Contest 2020, which was cancelled due to the COVID-19 pandemic. She finished in seventh place with 66 points.

=== 2021-present: Labyrinth and Circles ===
In March 2021, Heinzmann along with Johannes Oerding, DJ BoBo, Joris, Gentleman, Nura, and Mighty Oaks lead singer Ian Hooper filmed the eighth season of the reality television series Sing meinen Song - Das Tauschkonzert, the German version of The Best Singers series. Broadcast on VOX in May 2021, its episodes were produced at Gut Weißenhaus in Wangels due to the COVID-19 pandemic. On 14 May 2021, Heinzmann released her sixth studio album Labyrinth. She released her seventh studio album Circles through Seven.One Starwatch on 10 October 2025.

== Discography ==
=== Studio albums ===
- Masterplan (2008)
- Roots to Grow (2009)
- Stefanie Heinzmann (2012)
- Chance of Rain (2015)
- All We Need Is Love (2019)
- Labyrinth (2021)
- Circles (2025)

== Awards and nominations ==
=== Results ===
Year	Award	Nomination	Work	Result	Ref.
2008	Prix Walo	Best Newcomer	Herself	Won	
2008	Goldener Musikagent	Sympathieträger	Herself	Won	
2008	Radio Galaxy Awards	Newcomer of the Year	Herself	Won	
2008	1LIVE Krone Awards	Best Newcomer	Herself	Won	
2008	Comet Awards	Best Newcomer	Herself	Nominated	
2008	Nickelodeon Kids' Choice Awards	Favorite Singer (Switzerland)	Herself	Nominated	
2008	Jetix Awards	Newcomer of the Year	Herself	Nominated	
2009	Swiss Music Awards	Best Newcomer National	Herself	Won	
2009	Swiss Music Awards	Best Song National	My Man Is a Mean Man	Won	
2009	ECHO Awards	Best Female Artist National Rock/Pop	Herself	Won	
2009	Radio Regenbogen Awards	Radio Regenbogen Hörerpreis	Herself	Won	
2009	Comet Awards	Best Live Act	Herself	Won	
2009	Audi Generation Awards	Music	Herself	Won	
2009	Live Entertainment Awards	Audience Award	Herself	Nominated	
2009	ECHO Awards	Most Successful Newcomer National	Herself	Nominated	
2009	Comet Awards	Best Female Artist	Herself	Nominated	
2009	Goldene Henne	Music	Herself	Nominated	
2009	1LIVE Krone Awards	Best Artist	Herself	Nominated	
2010	Nickelodeon Kids' Choice Awards	Favorite Music Star (Switzerland)	Herself	Won	
2010	Swiss Music Awards	Best Live Act	Herself	Nominated	
2010	Swiss Music Awards	Best Album Pop/Rock National	Roots to Grow	Nominated	
2010	MTV Europe Music Awards	Best Swiss Act	Herself	Nominated	
2015	MTV Europe Music Awards	Best Swiss Act	Herself	Won	
2015	1LIVE Krone Awards	Best Female Artist	Herself	Nominated	
2016	Radio Regenbogen Awards	Song of the Year	In The End	Won	
2018	1LIVE Krone Awards	Best Female Artist	Herself	Nominated	
2019	1LIVE Krone Awards	Best Female Artist	Herself	Nominated	
2019	MTV Europe Music Awards	Best Swiss Act	Herself	Nominated	
2020	Swiss Music Awards	Best Female Act	Herself	Won	
2021	MTV Europe Music Awards	Best Swiss Act	Herself	Nominated	
