= Jonas Jeberg =

Danish songwriter and music producer

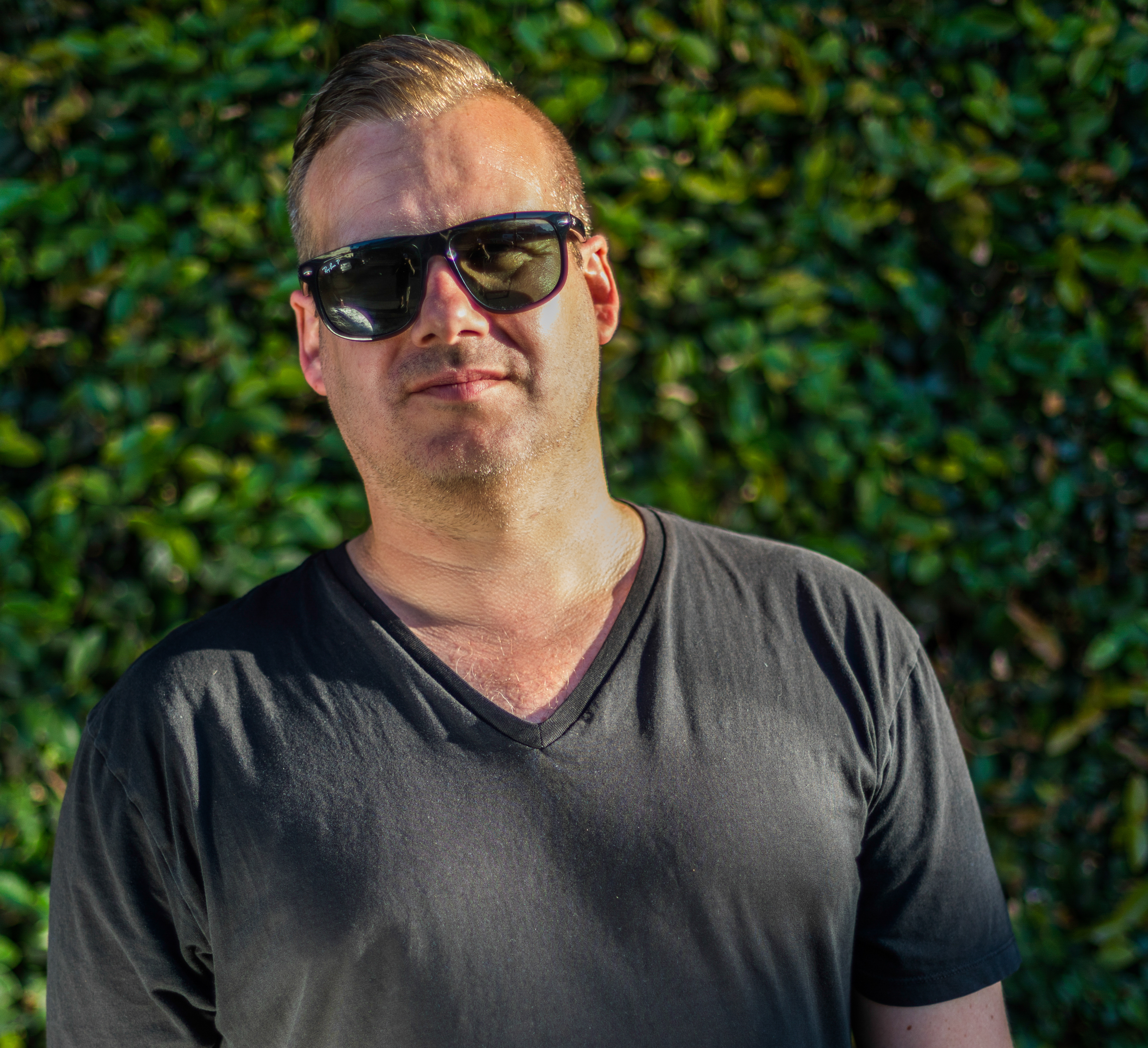
- Jeberg in 2018

Background information
- Born: January 28, 1975 (age 51); Rønne, Bornholm, Denmark
- Genres: R&B; pop
- Occupations: Songwriter; record producer
- Instruments: Drums, keyboards
- Years active: 1996–present

Jonas Jeberg (born January 28, 1975), is a Danish songwriter and music producer residing in Los Angeles. He has written and produced hit songs including Panic! at the Disco's "High Hopes", Doechii's "Nosebleeds" Selena Gomez's "Fetish" featuring Gucci Mane, Fifth Harmony's "Sledgehammer", Nicki Minaj's "The Boys", Chris Brown's "Remember My Name", Demi Lovato's "Made in the USA", Jason Derulo's "Marry Me", The Pussycat Dolls' "I Hate This Part" and Jordin Sparks' "One Step at a Time".

== Production / songwriting discography ==
Year	Song	Artist	Album
2006	"Emotions"	Double	
2006	"Let's Dance"	Vanessa Hudgens	V
2007	"I'll Remember You"	Ai	Don't Stop Ai
2007	"Brand New Day"	Ai	Don't Stop Ai
2007	"Lose Your Mind"	BoA	
2007	"Marchin'"	Corbin Bleu	Another Side
2007	"Deal With It"	Corbin Bleu	Another Side
2007	"Roll With You"	Corbin Bleu	Another Side
2007	"All I See"	Kylie Minogue	X
2007	"Like a Drug"	Kylie Minogue	X
2007	"Rippin' Up The Disco"	Kylie Minogue	X
2007	"Real Man"	Lexington Bridge featuring Snoop Dogg	The Vibe
2007	"Even Heaven Cries"	Monrose	Temptation
2007	"Get Your Clothes Off"	Nina Sky	
2007	"Stand by Your Side"	Shayne Ward	Breathless
2008	"Love Is Out of Reach"	Amy Pearson	Who I Am
2008	"Nightlife"	An-Ya featuring David Banner	
2008	"Burn"	Jessica Mauboy	Been Waiting
2008	"One Step at a Time"	Jordin Sparks	Jordin Sparks
2008	"I Hate This Part"	The Pussycat Dolls	Doll Domination
2009	"Dangerous"	Amerie	In Love & War
2009	"Jeg Vil Være Din"	Basim	Befri dig selv
2009	"Heal This Heartbreak"	JLS	JLS
2009	"What If the Heart Is Wrong"	Linda Andrews	Into the Light
2009	"Gravity"	Pixie Lott	Turn It Up
2009	"Turn It Up"	Pixie Lott	Turn It Up
2009	"My Love"	Pixie Lott	Turn It Up
2009	"Black Box"	Stan Walker	Introducing... Stan Walker
2010	"Louder (Put Your Hands Up)"	Chris Willis	
2010	"I'm Not Just a Girl"	School Gyrls	School Gyrls
2010	"Leave with a Song"	Sarah Connor	Real Love
2010	"Ghost of You"	Selena Gomez & the Scene	A Year Without Rain
2010	"Impossible" (Remix)	Shontelle	No Gravity
2010	"Heart Vacancy"	The Wanted	The Wanted
2010	"A Good Day for Love to Die"	The Wanted	The Wanted
2010	"Crash & Burn"	Sugababes	Sweet 7
2010	"Good Ol Fashioned Love"	The Overtones	Good Ol' Fashioned Love
2011	"Stand Behind the Music"	Anjulie	
2011	"Forever and a Day"	Kelly Rowland	Here I Am
2011	"What You Do"	Pixie Lott	Young Foolish Happy
2011	"Epic"	Big Time Rush	Elevate
2011	"Resuscitate Me"	September	Love CPR
2012	"Headphones"	Anjulie	
2012	"Remember My Name"	Chris Brown	Fortune
2012	"Breakfast (Syrup)"	Kreayshawn featuring 2 Chainz	Somethin' 'Bout Kreay
2012	"Blasé Blasé"	Kreayshawn	Somethin' 'Bout Kreay
2012	"Ch00k Ch00k Tare"	Kreayshawn featuring Chippy Nonstop	Somethin' 'Bout Kreay
2012	"Like It or Love It"	Kreayshawn featuring Kid Cudi	Somethin' 'Bout Kreay
2012	"K234ys0nixz"	Kreayshawn	Somethin' 'Bout Kreay
2012	"Bff (Bestfriend)"	Kreayshawn	Somethin' 'Bout Kreay
2012	"Twerkin!!!"	Kreayshawn featuring Diplo and Sissy Nobby	Somethin' 'Bout Kreay
2012	"Go Hard (La.La.La)"	Kreayshawn	Somethin' 'Bout Kreay
2012	"The Ruler"	Kreayshawn	Somethin' 'Bout Kreay
2012	"Love Haus"	Kreayshawn	Somethin' 'Bout Kreay
2012	"The Boys"	Nicki Minaj and Cassie	Pink Friday: Roman Reloaded – The Re-Up
2013	"Made in the USA"	Demi Lovato	Demi
2013	"Something Really Bad"	Dizzee Rascal	The Fifth
2013	"Marry Me"	Jason Derulo	Tattoos
2013	"Putcha Body Down"	Zendaya	Zendaya
2014	"Adrenaline"	Girls' Generation-TTS	Holler
2014	"Said Too Much"	Jessie J	Sweet Talker
2014	"Trampoline"	Kalin and Myles	Dedication
2014	"I Don't Really Care"	Kalin and Myles	Dedication
2015	"Sanctuary"	Allie X	CollXtion I
2015	"Double Tap"	Jordin Sparks featuring 2 Chainz	Right Here Right Now
2015	"Sledgehammer"	Fifth Harmony	Reflection
2015	"Wild Hearts"	R5	Sometime Last Night
2016	"Words"	Daya	Sit Still, Look Pretty
2016	"In Case You Missed It"	Daya	Sit Still, Look Pretty
2016	"We Are"	Daya	Sit Still, Look Pretty
2016	"Dare"	Daya	Sit Still, Look Pretty
2016	"The Truth"	Dirty Heads	Dirty Heads
2016	"Red Lights"	Dirty Heads	Dirty Heads
2016	"Yellow lights"	Keke Palmer	
2016	"Enemiez"	Keke Palmer featuring Jeremih	
2016	"Guns & Roses"	Sofia Carson	
2017	"The Way I Are (Dance With Somebody)"	Bebe Rexha featuring Lil Wayne	All Your Fault: Pt. 2
2017	"You Don't Do It For Me Anymore"	Demi Lovato	Tell Me You Love Me
2017	"Daddy Issues"	Demi Lovato	Tell Me You Love Me
2017	"Why"	Sabrina Carpenter	
2017	"Holding on"	Nightly	
2017	"Obsessed"	Maggie Linderman	
2017	"Oh god"	Era Estrefi	
2017	"Wish I didn't love you"	Chloe Kohanski	
2017	"Even if it hurts"	Rachel Platten	
2017	"Let her go"	Family of the year	
2017	"Vacation"	Dirty Heads	
2017	"Fetish"	Selena Gomez featuring Gucci Mane	
2017	"Reminding Me"	Shawn Hook featuring Vanessa Hudgens	My Side of Your Story
2018	"Cool"	Felix Jaehn featuring Marc E. Bassy and Gucci Mane	I
2018	"Wanna Be Missed"	Hayley Kiyoko	Expectations
2018	"Jacket"	Why don't we	8 Letters
2018	"In too deep"	Why don't we	8 Letters
2018	"Bad guy"	Niykee Heaton	
2018	"Shadow"	Jordan Mcgraw	
2018	"Even missing you feels good"	Dinah Jane	
2018	"No drama"	Alex Aiono	
2018	"Shed a Tear"	Kodaline	Politics of Living
2018	"High Hopes"	Panic! at the Disco	Pray for the Wicked
2019	"Take You Back"	Sabrina Carpenter	Singular: Act II
2019	"Girl in the Mirror"	Bebe Rexha	UglyDolls (soundtrack)
2019	"Larry David"	Alec King featuring Kiana Ledé	Greatest Hits Vol. 2
2019	"Own Way"	Shaylen	Highs and Lows
2019	"Parents"	Yungblud	
2019	"Rollercoaster"	The Jonas Brothers	Happiness Begins
2019	"Nothing Personal"	Liz Huett	
2019	"Livin' For The Weekend"	Fitz and the Tantrums	All the Feels
2019	"Super Magic"	Fitz and the Tantrums	All the Feels
2019	"Waste"	Dove Cameron	Bloodshot / Waste
2019	"Six in the morning"	TVXQ	XV
2020	"No Service In The Hills"	Cheat Codes featuring Trippie Redd, Blackbear and Princess Rosie	
2020	"Rise up"	Walk the moon	
2020	"Sink"	Maya B featuring Saint Jhn	
2020	"Wake Me When It's Over"	Faouzia	
2020	"Heartbreak Anthem"	Kyd the Band featuring Gnash	
2020	"I'm Bored"	Betta Lemme	
2020	"Linaria"	Tomohisa Yamashita	
2020	"My Way"	Aloe Blacc	All Love Everything
2020	"Hold On Tight"	Aloe Blacc	All Love Everything
2020	"Family"	Aloe Blacc	All Love Everything
2020	"All Love Everything"	Aloe Blacc	All Love Everything
2020	"Wherever You Go"	Aloe Blacc	All Love Everything
2020	"Nothing Left But You"	Aloe Blacc	All Love Everything
2020	"Glory Days"	Aloe Blacc	All Love Everything
2020	"Corner"	Aloe Blacc	All Love Everything
2020	"Harvard"	Aloe Blacc	All Love Everything
2020	"I Miss The Days"	Galxara featuring Party Pupils	
2020	"Too Many Friends"	Spencer Sutherland	
2020	"Inside Out"	Zedd and Griff	
2020	"Echoes"	Harry Hudson	Hey, I'm Here For You
2021	"LazyBaby"	Dove Cameron	
2021	"My Guy"	Leon Bridges	Space Jam: A New Legacy
2021	"Don't go changing"	Ylona Garcia	
2022	"Maybe You're the Problem"	Ava Max	Diamonds & Dancefloors
2022	"Sleepwalker"	Ava Max	Diamonds & Dancefloors
2022	"Mad"	Yungblud	
2023	"Touch down"	Calabasas	Touch down
2023	"High hopes"	Calabasas	Touch down
2023	"Touch down"	Calabasas	Touch down
2023	"Figure it out"	Calabasas	Touch down
2023	"Goin, Goin, gone"	Calabasas	Touch down
2023	"Anna"	Calabasas	Touch down
2023	"Goodbye to the old me"	Calabasas	Touch down
2023	"Those were the days"	Calabasas	Touch down
2023	"Stressed out"	Calabasas	Touch down
2023	"U like it"	Calabasas	Touch down
2023	"The better"	Calabasas	Touch down
2023	"The good in the bad"	Calabasas	Touch down
2023	"Girls"	Calabasas	Touch down
2023	"Hello me"	Jess Glynne	
2023	"Seasick"	Lozeak	
2023	"U should be mine"	Lozeak	
2023	"Uncut Gems"	The Whales	
2023	"Off the leash"	Feyi	
2023	"Wish I knew then what I know now"	AR/CO	
2023	"Call me if u down"	Maiya the don feat: Maeta	
2024	"H&M"	Latto	
2024	"Nothing but love"	Lu Kala	
2024	"Damage"	Genia	
2024	"10 out of 10"	Genia	
2024	"Double Barrel"	Rayna Roberts	
2025	"Nosebleeds"	Doechii	
2025	"Start a war"	Jennie	
2025	"Denim"	Kylie Cantrall	
2025	"Man on the moon"	Fitz & the Tantrums	Man on the moon
2025	"Okokok"	Fitz & the Tantrums	Man on the moon
2025	"Perfume"	Fitz & the Tantrums	Man on the moon
2025	"Ruin the night"	Fitz & the Tantrums	Man on the moon
2025	"Withdrawals"	Fitz & the Tantrums	Man on the moon
2025	"Thegood the bad the ugly"	Fitz & the Tantrums	Man on the moon
2025	"Where i go"	Fitz & the Tantrums	Man on the moon
2025	"One day"	Fitz & the Tantrums	Man on the moon
2025	"Oh Maria"	Fitz & the Tantrums	Man on the moon
2025	"Green light"	Fitz & the Tantrums	Man on the moon
2025	"Ride"	Fitz & the Tantrums	Man on the moon
2025	"Boba cha cha"	Fitz & the Tantrums	Man on the moon
2025	"Not waiting on the world"	Fitz & the Tantrums	Man on the moon
2025	"Toastyyy"	Genia	
2025	"Mustangs over Bentleys"	Rayna Roberts	
2025	"Choosy"	Jae Stephens	
2025	"Back of my heart"	Carly Rae Jepsen	
