= Break It Down =

Break It Down may refer to:

- "Break It Down" (The Chris Warren Band song)
- "Break It Down", a 1995 song by Malaika from Sugar Time album
- Break It Down (album), a 2014 album by SpeXial
- "Break It Down", a 2015 song by Lil Debbie

== See also ==
- "Break It"
- Break It All Down
- Break It On Down (disambiguation)
- Bring It (disambiguation)
