= Go Hard (La.La.La) =

Single by Kreayshawn

from the album Somethin' 'Bout Kreay
- Released: July 24, 2012
- Genre: Electropop
- Length: 3:38
- Label: Columbia
- Songwriters: Natassia Zolot; Jean-Baptiste; Ryan Buendia; Moritz Friedrich; Jonas Jeberg; Michael McHenry; Alexander Ridha
- Producers: Boys Noize; Free School; Moritz Friedrich; Jonas Jeberg

Kreayshawn singles chronology
"Breakfast (Syrup)" (2012)	"Go Hard (La.La.La)" (2012)	"Majora" (2025)

Music video
- "Go Hard (La.La.La)" on YouTube

"Go Hard (La.La.La)" is a song by American rapper Kreayshawn from her debut studio album, Somethin' 'Bout Kreay (2012). Kreayshawn wrote the song with Jean-Baptiste, Ryan Buendia, Moritz Friedrich, Jonas Jeberg, Michael McHenry, and Alexander "Boys Noize" Ridha. It was produced by Boys Noize, Free School, Moritz Friedrich, and Jeberg. Columbia Records released it as the album's third single on July 24, 2012. "Go Hard (La.La.La)" is an electropop song, on which Kreayshawn encourages self-assurance as she details rebellious activities.

"Go Hard (La.La.La)" reached number 29 on the Rhythmic Airplay chart in the US. The song also peaked at number 58 on the Ultratip Bubbling Under chart in Belgium. Syndrome directed its music video, in which Kreayshawn dances alongside rapper Lil Debbie in a half-animated fantasyland. She performed the song on the television show Jimmy Kimmel Live! and included it on the set list of her 2012 concert tour, the Group Hug Tour.

== Critical reception ==
"Go Hard (La.La.La)" has received mixed reviews. Spin magazine's Marc Hogan criticized Kreayshawn for abandoning her traditional hip hop style for the conventional electropop themes heard on the radio. Continuing in his negative review, Hogan went on to call the spoken-word intro and the pre-chorus of the song "ridiculous", and "not in the good way". In a review of Somethin' 'Bout Kreay, Siân Rowe of NME gave "Go Hard (La.La.La)" a positive review, comparing Kreayshawn's aesthetic in the song to that of Katy Perry's, stating "The Katy Perry thing works fine when upbeat (like on ‘Go Hard (La. La. La)'". Adam Bychawski of Drowned in Sound, dubbed certain tracks from Somethin' 'Bout Kreay, including "Go Hard (La.La.La)", a "preponderance of bland dance tracks".

Tyler McDermott of Billboard praised the song's "melodic lyrics", further stating that the song "offer[s] up a genuine flare that remains rare in crossover records". Exclaim!'s Gregory Adams noted a "bouncy", "pumped-up pop-rap jam" with "a synth-and-808 arrangement that sounds something like OMD being cribbed by Tag Team". Frank Mojica of Consequence negatively compared the song to "Gucci Gucci", in which he claimed that it "is the musical equivalent of a disappointing sequel, one that's too familiar, calculated, and ultimately missing the spark."

== Music video ==
The song's music video was directed by production crew Syndrome.

== Commercial performance ==
"Go Hard (La.La.La)" spent five weeks on the U.S. Rhythmic Songs chart, peaking at number 29, on the week of October 6, 2012. The song also spent 4 weeks on the Belgium Ultratip Bubbling Under chart in Flanders, peaking at number 58 on September 22, 2012.

== Credits and personnel ==
Credits are adapted from the liner notes of Somethin' 'Bout Kreay.

- Natassia Zolot – songwriter, vocals
- Jean-Baptiste – songwriter, additional instrumentation, drum programming
- Ryan Buendia – songwriter, additional instrumentation, drum programming, scratches
- Moritz Friedrich – producer, songwriter, instrumentation
- Jonas Jeberg – producer, songwriter, additional instrumentation, drum programming
- Michael McHenry – songwriter, additional instrumentation, drum programming
- Alexander Ridha – producer, songwriter, instrumentation
- Free School – producer
- Renato Lopez – recording
- Jaycen Joshua – mixing
- Trehy Harris – mixing assistant
- Brian Gardner – mastering

== Charts ==
Chart positions for "Go Hard (La.La.La)"
Chart (2012)	Peak position
Belgium (Ultratip Bubbling Under Flanders)	58
US Rhythmic Airplay (Billboard)	29

== Release history ==
Country	Date	Format	Label	Ref
United States	July 24, 2012	Digital download	Sony Music Entertainment	
