= Lil Debbie discography =

American Rapper

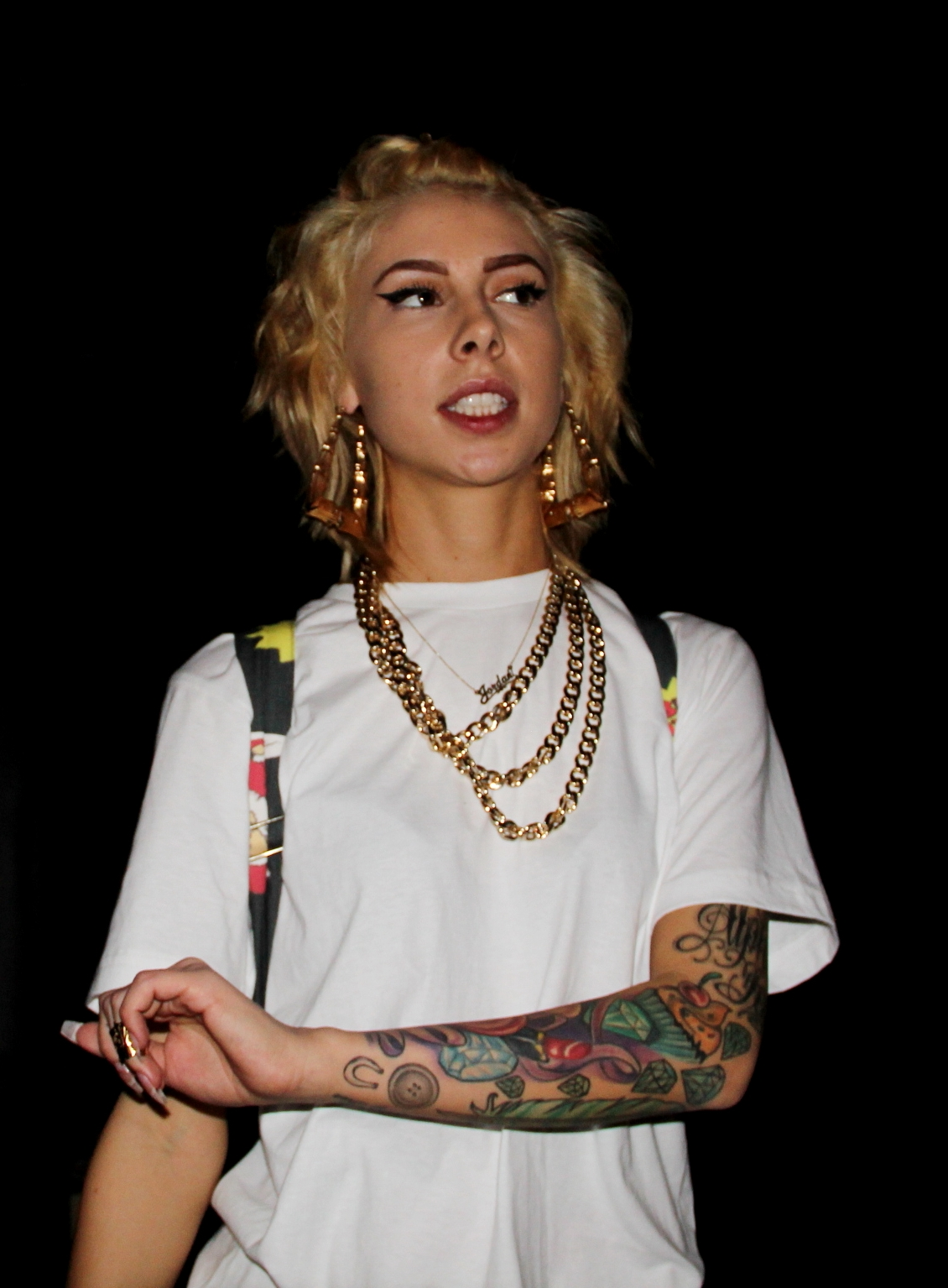
- Lil Debbie in March 2013
- Studio albums: 2
- EPs: 4
- Compilation albums: 1
- Singles: 17
- Music videos: 19
- Mixtapes: 2

American rapper Lil Debbie has released one compilation album, four extended plays (EPs), two mixtapes, seventeen singles (including four as a featured artist and two promotional singles) and nineteen music videos.

In 2011, Debbie was a member of the White Girl Mob, a group consisting of herself and fellow rappers Kreayshawn and V-Nasty. Following an appearance in the music video for Kreayshawn's "Gucci Gucci", Debbie released a series of music videos alongside fellow rappers Riff Raff, V-Nasty and DollaBillGates. These songs later saw commercial release as singles, eventually being compiled on to a mixtape titled Keep It Lit, and became Debbie's first releases as a musician. Two years later, Debbie released her first commercial project, an EP titled Queen D. The EP featured three original tracks, all of which were accompanied by music videos, and two remixes. Due to its short length, Queen D was not eligible to chart on any album charts in the United States. However, it charted at 19 on the US Billboard Singles Sales Chart, and 4 on the US Billboard R&B/Hip-Hop Singles Sales Chart.

In 2014, Debbie released her second EP, California Sweetheart, Pt. 1. The EP charted at 22 on the US Billboard Heatseekers Albums Chart. In August, a follow-up EP, California Sweetheart, Pt. 2 was released, but failed to attain the commercial success of its predecessor. In October of that year, a compilation of the two California Sweetheart EPs was released. The following month, Debbie's second mixtape, Young B!tch, was released. In June 2015, Debbie released the single "Lofty", which appeared on the Colt 45 mixtape Colt 15. Debbie released her fourth EP, titled Home Grown, in July. The EP featured guest appearances from Wiz Khalifa, Paul Wall and Bricc Baby Shitro.

In the midst of the 2020 COVID-19 pandemic, Capozzi got invited to open for NightBass and AC Slater (under her own name CAPOZZI). This was once of her first public performances for NightBass Records through their Twitch live stream.

== Albums ==
=== Commercial Mixtapes ===
List of studio albums, with selected details
Title	Details
Debbie	Released: July 15, 2016; Label: Lil Debbie Records; Format: CD, digital download
OG in My System	Released: August 18, 2017; Label: Lil Debbie Records; Format: Digital download

=== Compilation albums ===
List of compilation albums, with selected details
Title	Details
California Sweetheart	Released: October 20, 2014; Label: Traffic Entertainment; Format: CD, digital download

=== EPs ===
List of extended plays, with selected details and chart positions
Title	Details	Peak chart positions		
Title	Details	US Heat	US Sales	US R&B /HH Sales
Queen D	Released: October 22, 2013; Label: Give N Go Sounds, Dumbluck; Format: Digital download	—	19	4
California Sweetheart, Pt. 1	Released: March 25, 2014; Label: Self-released; Format: Digital download	22	—	—
California Sweetheart, Pt. 2	Released: August 5, 2014; Label: Self-released; Format: Digital download	—	—	—
Home Grown	Released: July 31, 2015; Label: Self-released; Format: Digital download	—	—	—
XXIII	Released: March 3, 2017; Label: Barong Family; Format: Digital download	—	—	—
I'm the Rapper He's the Producer (with Kid Class)	Released: February 2, 2018; Label: Self-released; Format: Digital download	—	—	—
Bay Chronicles	Released: March 29, 2019; Label: Self-released; Format: Digital download	—	—	—
"—" denotes a recording that did not chart or was not released in that territory.

=== Mixtapes ===
List of mixtapes, showing selected details
Title	Details
Keep It Lit	Released: July 26, 2012; Label: Self-released; Format: Digital download
Young B!tch	Released: November 20, 2014; Label: Self-released; Formats: CD, digital download

== Singles ==
=== As lead artist ===
List of singles as a lead artist, showing year released and album name
Title	Year	Album
"Brain Freeze" (with Riff Raff)	2012	Keep It Lit
"Gotta Ball" (with V-Nasty)	2012	Non-album singles
"Michelle Obama" (featuring Riff Raff)	2012	Non-album singles
"I Do It" (featuring Kool John)	2013	Non-album singles
"Ratchets"	2013	Queen D
"Bake a Cake"	2013	Queen D
"$lot Machine"	2014	California Sweetheart, Pt. 1
"Work the Middle"	2014	California Sweetheart Pt. 2
"Me and You"	2015	Young B!tch
"Lofty"	2015	Colt 15
"Break It Down"	2015	Home Grown
"Summer"	2017	OG In My System
"2 Cups"	2017	Non-Album Singles
"Boss Bitch" (featuring Kim Lee)	2017	Non-Album Singles

=== As featured artist ===
List of singles as a featured artist, showing year released and album name
Title	Year	Album
"Suckas Askin' Questions" (Riff Raff featuring Lil Debbie)	2013	Non-album single
"Plugged" (SD featuring Lil Debbie)	2014	SXEW Vol. 2
"Get Lit" (Will Sparks featuring Lil Debbie)	2015	Non-album singles
"You Mad" (Alexis Ayaana featuring Lil Debbie)	2015	Non-album singles
"Tinder Surprise" (Wacko featuring Lil Debbie)	2016	Non-album singles
"To The Max" (Yellow Claw featuring Mc. Kekel, Lil Debbie, Bok Nero and MC Gustta)	2018	New Blood

=== Promotional singles ===
List of promotional singles, showing year released and album name
Title	Year	Album
"What it Look Like" (Remix) (featuring Katie Got Bandz)	2014	California Sweetheart, Pt. 1
"420" (featuring Wiz Khalifa)	2015	Home Grown
"Break It Down"	2015	Home Grown
"Summer"	2017	OG In My System
"Stunt"	2018	I'm The Rapper He's The Producer
"Goyard"	2018	I'm The Rapper He's The Producer

== Guest appearances ==
List of non-single guest appearances, showing other artist(s), year released and album name
Title	Year	Other artist(s)	Album
"Supa High"	2013	Kool John	Chill.Drink.Fuck.Smoke
"Rare"	2013	Bobby Brackins	Maxwell Park
"Not the Same"	2013	Rollz Royce Rizzy	None
"The Pay"	2014	HS87, B Mac The Queen	We The Plug
"Feel so Good"	2014	Sasha Go Hard	Feel So Good
"Pump" (Brodinski Remix)	2014	Jackson and His Computerband	None
"Definition Of A Fuck Nigga"	2015	Trinidad James, Problem	No One Is $afe
"Real One"	2015	Bricc Baby Shitro	Nasty Dealer
"Watch This"	2016	Demrick	Collect Call
"Set It Off"	2016	Sasha Go Hard	The Realest I know
"420 Vibe"	2016	Dizzy Wright	General Hydroponics Vol. 4
"Pop It"	2016	Wiwek	The Free & Rebellious
"Rotation"	2016	The Mekanix	Under The Hood
"Watch This"	2016	Demrick	Collect Call
"Hello Kitty Mobbin"	2016	Daniel Dahmer	Snapbacks & Fannypacks
"Go Get It"	2016	Riff Raff	Balloween
"Major Later"	2017	Demrick	Non-Album Single
"City on Lockdown"	2017	Juicy J, Yellow Claw	Los Amsterdam
"Raw Cypher"	2017	Devour, BEEZ, Dave East, Demrick	Raw Cypher 5
"I do it"	2018	O5iru5, KoolJohn	Squirt

== Music videos ==
=== As lead artist ===
List of music videos as lead artist, showing year released and director
Title	Year	Director(s)	Ref.
"Brain Freeze" (with Riff Raff)	2012	Grizz Lee	
"Squirt" (with Riff Raff)	2012	Max Albert	
"2 Cups" (with DollaBillGates)	2012	Max Albert	
"Gotta Ball" (with V-Nasty)	2012	Max Albert	
"Michelle Obama" (featuring Riff Raff)	2012	Max Albert	
"Ratchets"	2013	J.B. Ghuman Jr.	
"Bake a Cake"	2013	Joe Dietsch	
"Bitches"	2013	Joe Dietsch; Louie Gibson	
"$lot Machine"	2014	Grizz Lee	
"Work the Middle"	2014	Joe Dietsch; Louie Gibson	
"On Sight" (featuring MPA Shitro & Jay Owens)	2014	Lil Debbie	
"Wiggle"	2014	Grizz Lee	
"Me and You"	2015	Lil Debbie	
"Trap Lust"	2015	Unknown	
"Lofty"	2015	Joe Dietsch	
"Let's Get High"	2015	Joe Dietsch	
"Break It Down"	2015	Lil Debbie	
"Don't Hate"	2016	Grizzlee	

=== As featured artist ===
List of music videos as featured artist, showing year released and director
Title	Year	Director(s)	Ref.
"Suckas Askin' Questions" (Riff Raff featuring Lil Debbie)	2013	Kale Eickhof	
"Definition Of A Fuck Nigga" (Trinidad James featuring Problem and Lil Debbie)	2015	Vincent Lou Films	
