= Break It On Down =

The title Break It On Down and variants can apply to multiple different hip-hop songs:

- ".357 – Break It On Down" (also known as just "Break It On Down"), a track from LL Cool J's 1987 release Bigger and Deffer
- "Break It On Down", a track from 2 Live Crew's 1989 release As Nasty As They Wanna Be
- "Break It On Down", a track from 95 South's 1995 release One Mo' 'Gen
- "Break It On Down (Battlezone)" (also known as just "Break It On Down"), a track by Flii Stylz & Tenashus in 2005's Rize

== See also ==
- "Break It"
- Break It All Down
- Break It Down (disambiguation)
- Bring It (disambiguation)
