= What It Look Like =

What It Look Like may refer to:

- "What It Look Like", a song by Curren$y from the 2012 album The Stoned Immaculate
- "What It Look Like", a song by French Montana from the 2019 album Montana
- "What It Look Like", a song by Lil Debbie from the 2014 EP California Sweetheart
