= Breakfast (Syrup) =

Single by Kreayshawn featuring 2 Chainz

from the album Somethin' 'Bout Kreay
- Released: May 22, 2012
- Recorded: 2012
- Genre: Electro-hop
- Length: 2:51
- Label: Columbia
- Songwriters: Natassia Zolot; Jean Baptiste; Ryan Buendia; Tauheed Epps; Jonas Jeberg; Michael McHenry
- Producers: Free School; Jonas Jeberg

Kreayshawn singles chronology
"Gucci Gucci" (2011)	"Breakfast (Syrup)" (2012)	"Go Hard (La.La.La)" (2012)

2 Chainz singles chronology
"No Lie" (2012)	"Breakfast (Syrup)" (2012)	"Beez in the Trap" (2012)

Music video
- "Breakfast (Syrup)" on YouTube

"Breakfast (Syrup)" is a song by American rapper Kreayshawn, released on May 22, 2012, as the second single from her debut studio album, Somethin' 'Bout Kreay (2012). The song features guest vocals from Southern rapper 2 Chainz, with whom Kreayshawn previously collaborated on his song "Murder" for his mixtape T.R.U. REALigion (2011).

== Music video ==
Kreayshawn produced and directed the song's music video herself. "My favorite part about the video shoot was the breakfast party in the kitchen," she said. "It was so colorful and just how I envisioned it when I wrote the treatment." Before the video's premiere, she described the concept behind the video as, "[...breakfast is] the most important meal of the day, so everybody needs their breakfast. It will be a great music video because I directed it and everything I direct is great." The video premiered on her official VEVO channel on May 21, 2012, one day before being officially released on iTunes. Rap artist formerly known as Tity Boi, 2 Chainz, makes an appearance in the video. The video features Kreayshawn and others pouring maple syrup over breakfast food items, such as pancakes and cereal. In the chorus, Kreayshawn raps, "'I'm hungry/ Hungry for this money/ Call me Kreay Hefner/ Playboy bunny," alluding to Hugh Hefner and his Playboy adult magazine empire.

== Critical reception ==
Breakfast (Syrup) was generally well received by music critics. Charlie Norwood of MTV Buzzworthy called "Breakfast (Syrup)", "..a synthed-out 808 party jam that's not breaking any ground, but it's catchy." Furthering the review, he said, "Just when Kreay's voice [...] is about to give you a stroke, 2 Chainz (who's now legally required to be on every new rap song) shows up in a rain jacket with two gallons of syrup to save the day." Norwood criticized the track, calling attention to the drug subculture allusions. He pointed out that, while the song was destined to be a hit with teenagers, parents might miss the drug undertones. He closed the critique by saying, "Enjoy having your 20-year-old college dropout with a codeine dependency and $20,000 in nondeferrable student loan debt move back home," as a result of listening to the song. Complex Magazine named the song the third worst song of 2012. Allmusic picked "Breakfast (Syrup)" as a highlight of the album. NME criticized her for rhyming the word "breakfast" with "breakfast" but complimented the chorus ("I got all the syrup/I got all the syrup/Juice, cheese, bread, breakfast!"), calling it a quotable play on food and money.

Spin magazine's Marc Hogan commented on Kreayshawn's follow-up music video to "Breakfast", "Go Hard". He noticed that Kreayshawn ditched her traditional hip-hop style for the conventional electropop themes heard on the radio, remarking that "Breakfast (Syrup)"'s failure to light up mainstream music charts sparked the genre-shift.

== Release information ==
Country	Date	Format	Label	Ref
United States	May 22, 2012	Digital download	Sony Music Entertainment	
