= The Vibe (Lexington Bridge album) =

Studio album by Lexington Bridge
- Released: 23 November 2007
- Length: 49:10
- Label: Polydor
- Producer: Deekay; Flo Fischer; S. Kirchner; Novel; Paul NZA; Marek Pompetzki; Mark Qura Rankin; Remee; Jonas Saeed; Harry Sommerdahl; Adel Tawil; Thomas Troelsen; Ferari Zand

Singles from The Vibe
- 1. "Kick Back" Released: 9 February 2007; 2. "Real Man" Released: 21 September 2007; 3. "Everything I Am" Released: 11 October 2007

The Vibe is the first and only studio album by multi-national boy band Lexington Bridge. It was released on 23 November 2007 by Polydor Records. The band worked with a variety of musicians on the album, including Paul NZA, Marek Pompetzki, Remee, Jonas Saeed, Adel Tawil, and Thomas Troelsen. Released to minor commercial success, The Vibe debuted and peaked at number 86 on the German Albums Chart. It was preceded by the singles "Kick Back" and "Real Man," both of which reached the top 30 and top 20 of the German Singles Chart, respectively.

== Singles ==
"Kick Back," co-written by Tony Momrelle was released as the album's first single. It peaked at number 24 on the German Singles Chart and reached number 62 in Austria. Second single "Real Man" featuring American rapper Snoop Dogg marked the band's only top 20 hit. It peaked at number 16 in Germany and reached number 66 on the Austrian Singles Chart. A third single, "Everything I Am", failed to chart.

=== Other songs ===
- "Go On and Go" is a promo single off the album, released in select countries.
- "I Just Can't Hate You" is not a single, but a music video of the song was released to promote the album.

== Critical reception ==
German magazine Stern dismissed the album as "interchangeable pop."

== Cover versions ==
A Chinese version of the song "Real Man" was recorded by Taiwanese pop singer Jolin Tsai for her 2009 album Butterfly.

== Track listing ==
The Vibe track listing
No.	Title	Writer(s)	Producer(s)	Length
1.	"Real Man" (featuring Snoop Dogg)	Remee; Nina Woodford; Calvin Broadus; Mich Hansen; Jonas Jeberg	Harry Sommerdahl	3:58
2.	"Your Forgiveness"	Cliff Masterson; Mark Read; Pete Martin; Robert Hart	Marek Pompetzki; Paul NZA	3:18
3.	"Kick Back"	Mark Qura Rankin; Tony Momrelle	Rankin	3:46
4.	"Hook Up"	Jonas Saeed; Moe Alazzawie; Pia Sjöberg	Saeed	3:26
5.	"Tear It Up"	Jeberg; Robbie Nevil; Sebastian Mego	Pompetzki; NZA	3:30
6.	"Alisha"	Bilal Hajji; Gordon Cyrus; Nadir Khayat; Novel Jannusi	Novel; Ferari Zand	3:26
7.	"You Are My Everything"	Adel Tawil; Florian Fischer; Tarek Hussein	Tawil; Fischer; S. Kirchner	3:49
8.	"Everything I Am"	Saeed; Johan Lindman	Saeed	4:12
9.	"Other Girls"	Saeed; Alazzawie; Sjöberg	Saeed	3:03
10.	"I Just Can't Hate You"	Tim Hawes; Obi Mhondera; Peter Kirtley	Pompetzki; NZA	3:37
11.	"Call Me"	Saeed; Alazzawie; Teron Beal	Saeed	3:17
12.	"Go On And Go"	Dax O'Callaghan; Lars Halvor Jensen; Marc Nelson; Martin M. Larsson	Deekay	3:11
13.	"Vibrate"	Remee; Thomas Troelsen	Remee; Troelsen	3:09

== Charts ==
Chart performance for The Vibe
Chart (2007)	Peak position
German Albums (Offizielle Top 100)	86
