= LXB =

LXB may refer to:

- Lexington Bridge (band), a musical group by Universal Music
- LXB, the division code of Liangxi District
