= Somethin 'Bout Kreay =

2012 studio album by Kreayshawn

Studio album by Kreayshawn
- Released: September 14, 2012
- Genre: Alternative hip-hop
- Length: 44:10
- Label: Columbia
- Producers: Free School; Jonas Jeberg; DJ Two Stacks; Kid Cudi; Diplo; Tai; Boys Noize; Moritz Friedrich

Kreayshawn chronology
Young, Rich & Flashy (2012)	Somethin 'Bout Kreay (2012)	#LuvMyFanz (2013)

Singles from Somethin 'Bout Kreay
- 1. "Gucci Gucci" Released: June 14, 2011; 2. "Breakfast (Syrup)" Released: May 22, 2012; 3. "Go Hard (La.La.La)" Released: July 24, 2012

Somethin 'Bout Kreay is the debut studio album by American rapper Kreayshawn. Columbia Records released the album on September 14, 2012. Kreayshawn worked with producers including Free School, Jonas Jeberg, DJ Two Stacks, Kid Cudi, Diplo, Tai, Boys Noize, and Moritz Friedrich. Featured artists include Chippy Nonstop, V-Nasty, Kid Cudi, Diplo, Sissy Nobby, and 2 Chainz. It is an alternative hip-hop album, which Kreayshawn conceived after its lead single, "Gucci Gucci", went viral online. Somethin 'Bout Kreay's lyrical themes revolve around self-confidence and partying.

Critics were divided in their reviews of Somethin 'Bout Kreay. Several of the tracks received positive reviews, most notably "Gucci Gucci", but most of the other songs were panned by critics.

== Critical reception ==
Professional ratings
Aggregate scores
Source	Rating
Metacritic	42/100
Review scores
Source	Rating
AllMusic	3/5 stars
The A.V. Club	D
Consequence of Sound	2/5 stars
NME	5/10
Now	1/5 stars
Pitchfork	3.0/10
PopMatters	4/10
Rolling Stone	3/5 stars
Spin	3/10
Under the Radar	2/10

Critics were divided in their opinions of Somethin 'Bout Kreay. At Metacritic, which assigns a weighted average rating out of 100 to reviews from mainstream critics, the album received an average score of 42, based on 14 reviews, which indicates "mixed or average reviews". Uncut gave the album a score of 6 out of 10 rating, stating, "Thanks to her Valley Girl charisma and omnivorous sexual gaze she mostly succeeds." On a similar note, Rolling Stone gave Somethin 'Bout Kreay a positive review, with the album receiving 3 of 5 stars rating and furthermore telling "The Oakland MC's debut explores her skill at giving hormonally bonkers post-Odd Future shock rap a bratty, ashtray-Madonna spin." "Blasé Blasé", "Breakfast (Syrup)", "Gucci Gucci", "Left Ey3" have generally been well received, the other tracks have been criticized or completely panned by critics.

In a negative review, Carrie Battan of Pitchfork rated the album only 3 out of 10 points and explained "Somethin 'Bout Kreay could very well be her first and last." At large, the production for Somethin 'Bout Kreay was praised. While the fun factor on the record was commended, the lyrics were generally criticized. NME gave the album 5 of 10 stars rating, saying "Over 13 tracks, though, Kreay's 'thing' wears waaay thin." A negative review came from Under The Radar who gave the album a score of 2 out of 10, and said "It's a pop album of awful pop music." Random Independent listed Somethin 'Bout Kreay in its 'best albums of 2012 list' as a 'special mention', without a concrete place.

== Commercial performance ==
Somethin 'Bout Kreay debuted at number 112 on the Billboard 200 in its first week of release, selling 3,502 copies. On January 16, 2014, Kreayshawn tweeted a screenshot of her portion of profit off of the album, the total profit made by Kreayshawn was $0.01.

== Track listing ==
Track listing confirmed on Amazon. Writing and production credits taken from the album booklet.

No.	Title	Writer(s)	Producer	Length
1.	"Blasé Blasé"	Natassia Zolot; Jean Baptiste; Ryan Buendia; Jonas Jeberg; Michael McHenry; Darryl McDaniels; Jason Mizell; Joseph Simmons; Lawrence Smith; Russell Simons	Free School; Jonas Jeberg	3:21
2.	"Ch00k Ch00k Tare" (featuring Chippy Nonstop)	Zolot; Baptiste; Buendia; Jeberg; McHenry; Madhu Nanda	Free School; Jonas Jeberg	2:52
3.	"Gucci Gucci"	Zolot; Anthony Negrete; Michael Weiner	DJ Two Stacks	3:07
4.	"Summertime" (featuring V-Nasty)	Zolot; Vanessa Reece; Weiner	DJ Two Stacks	4:02
5.	"Left Ey3"	Zolot; Weiner; Negrete	DJ Two Stacks	3:21
6.	"Like It or Love It" (featuring Kid Cudi)	Zolot; Baptiste; Buendia; Jeberg; McHenry; Scott Mescudi	Kid Cudi; Free School; Jonas Jeberg	3:21
7.	"K234ys0nixz"	Zolot; Baptiste; Buendia; Jeberg; McHenry; Dania Birks; Juana Burns; Juanita Lee; Kim Nazel; Fatimah Shaheed	Free School; Jonas Jeberg (co.)	2:41
8.	"Bff (Bestfriend)"	Zolot; Baptiste; Buendia; Jeberg; McHenry	Free School; Jonas Jeberg	2:55
9.	"Twerkin!!!" (featuring Diplo & Sissy Nobby)	Zolot; Thomas Wesley Pentz; Baptiste, Buendia; Terelle Gallo; Tai Jason; Jeberg; McHenry	Diplo; Tai; Free School; Jonas Jeberg (co.)	4:07
10.	"Breakfast (Syrup)" (featuring 2 Chainz)	Zolot; Baptiste; Buendia; Tauheed Epps; Jeberg; McHenry	Free School; Jonas Jeberg	2:49
11.	"Go Hard (La.La.La)"	Zolot; Baptiste; Buendia; Moritz Friedrich; Jeberg; McHenry; Alexander Ridha	Boys Noize; Free School; Moritz Friedrich; Jonas Jeberg	3:38
12.	"The Ruler"	Zolot; Baptiste; Buendia; Jeberg; McHenry; Ridha	Boys Noize; Free School; Jonas Jeberg	3:35
13.	"Luv Haus"	Zolot; Baptiste; Buendia; Jeberg; McHenry	Free School; Jonas Jeberg	4:21
Total length:				44:10

Japanese edition bonus tracks
No.	Title	Length
14.	"Bumpin' Bumpin'"	4:16
15.	"Go Hard (La.La.La)" (Yuri Beats Remix)	4:07

== Charts ==
Chart (2012)	Peak position
US Billboard 200	112
US Top Heatseekers	2
US Top Rap Albums	16
US Top R&B/Hip-Hop Albums	19
