= MetWest High School =

High school in California, United States

Coordinates: 37.7953°N 122.2579°W

MetWest High School is a public high school in Oakland, California, United States. It is especially focused on learning through internships. The Oakland Unified School District (OUSD) states that the school "has among the highest attendance rates, the highest California High School Exit Exam pass rates, and lowest suspension rates of all OUSD high schools". The school opened in 2002 and serves 157 students from grades 9 through 12 from all parts of Oakland.
