= Into the Light (Linda Andrews album) =

Studio album by Linda Andrews
- Released: 16 June 2009
- Recorded: 2009
- Genre: Pop Rock
- Label: Sony Music

Linda Andrews chronology
Into the Light	TBA

Singles from Into the Light
- 1. "Into the Light"; 2. "Mirror, Mirror"

"Into the Light " is the debut album by Linda Andrews, winner of the second season of the Danish version of the X-Factor. It was released on June 16, 2009.

== Track list ==
No.	Title	Length
1.	"Parachute"	3:25
2.	"Into the Light"	3:26
3.	"Mirror Mirror"	3:13
4.	"Shot of Change"	3:23
5.	"Why?"	3:20
6.	"Disconnected"	4:18
7.	"What If the Heart Is Wrong"	4:03
8.	"Lose You"	3:20
9.	"Square One"	3:28
10.	"Det Bedste Til Sidst"	3:18
11.	"Í Búri"	3:22
12.	"My Everything (Song for Celeste)"	3:38
13.	"Be Brave"	4:00
