= Linda Andrews (singer) =

Faroese singer

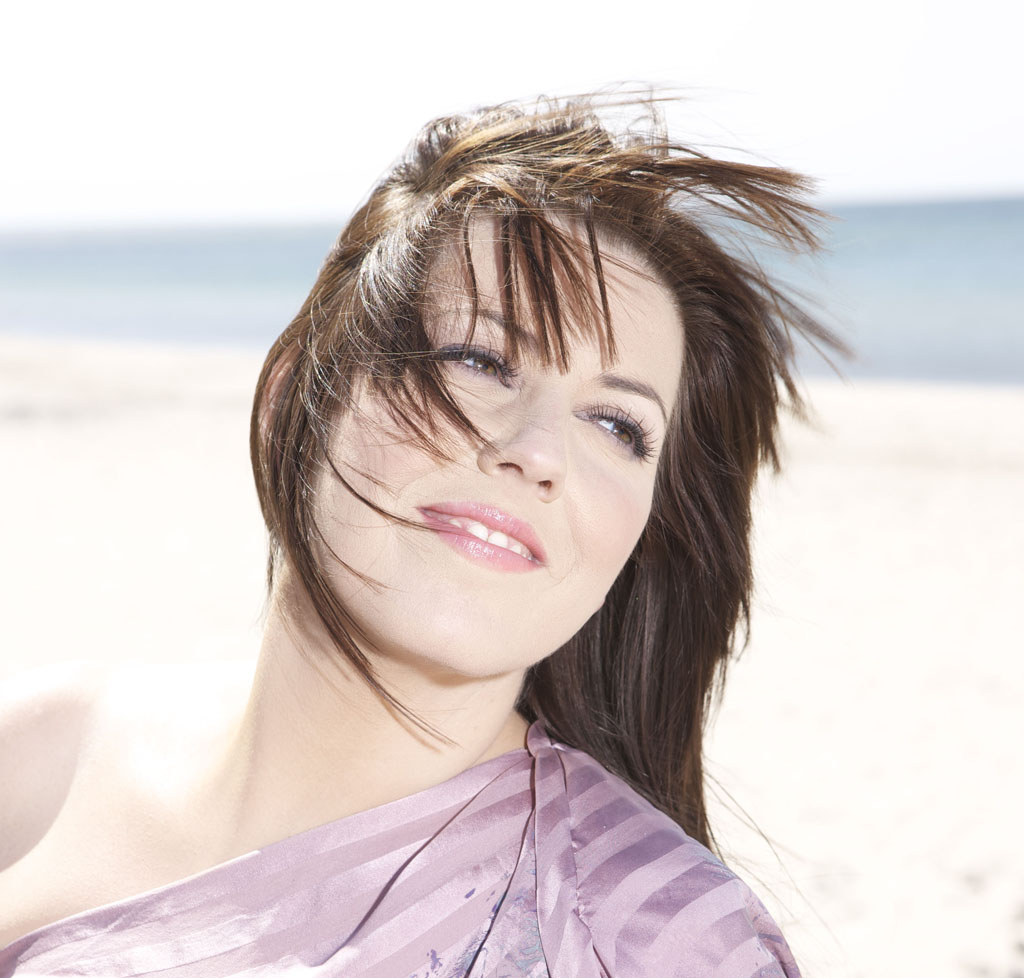

Background information
- Also known as: Linda
- Born: Linda Andreasen; 19 October 1973 (age 52); Tórshavn, Faroe Islands
- Occupation: Singer
- Instrument: Vocals
- Years active: 1994–present
- Website: www.lindaandrews.dk

Linda Andrews (born 19 October 1973) is a Faroese singer who won the second season of the Danish version of The X Factor, and became the first Faroese winner of it.

== Early life ==
She was born and raised in Tórshavn. She lived for many years with her father (a taxi driver) and mother in the western part of Torshavn called Vesturbýurin. She attended a Pentecostal church called Filadelfia until early adulthood. She was very active in youth work and in the choirs. During the early 1990s she became a known singer because of her appearance as one of the lead singers in Filadelfia. She also was in the Filadelfia Youth Choir and the Filadelfia Choir. She also sang with Vanja Carlsen (of the Carlsens) and was seen as a rival to the singer scene domination in the Filadelfia church. Later on in life she went Frydensberg and then after that she went to live abroad. She has a daughter, with whom she lives in Valby. Her daughter got her to join X Factor, and she eventually auditioned in Copenhagen. Andrews had recently divorced her husband of seven years, and she wanted to prove to her daughter that she could stand on her own feet. She comes from a large family in the Faroe Islands and has 4 older siblings. Prior to her rise to fame on X Factor, Andrews made her solo album debut in 2008 with Revelation, a gospel album, and prior to that, she released recordings such as "Hot Santa," a Christmas-themed novelty single from 2006.

== Performances during X Factor ==
Episode	Theme	Song	Artist	Result
Audition	Free Choice	"The Power of Love"	Jennifer Rush	Through to Bootcamp Day 1
Bootcamp Day 1	Free Choice			Through to Bootcamp Day 2
Bootcamp Day 2	Free Choice	"When You Believe"	Whitney Houston and Mariah Carey	Through to Live shows
Live show 1	Hits	"Because Of You"	Kelly Clarkson	Safe
Live show 2	Made in Denmark	"Vårvise"	Sebastian & Sissel Kyrkjebø	Safe
Live show 3	Motown	"You Can't Hurry Love"	The Supremes	Safe
Live show 4	ABBA	"Money, Money, Money"	ABBA	Safe
Live show 5	DR Big Band	"Mercy"	Duffy	Safe
Live show 6 – Semi-final	Sanne Salomonsen	"Hvis Du Forstod"	Sanne Salomonsen	Safe
Live show 6 – Semi-final	Dedikation	"Unwritten"	Natasha Bedingfield	Safe
Live show 7 – Final	Free choice	"So What"	P!nk	Safe
Live show 7 – Final	Winner's single	"Det Bedste Til Sidst"	Linda Andrews	Winner

== The X Factor ==
Throughout the series, she was mentored by Lina Rafn of Infernal. In the final, she sang "So What" by Pink and a new song written by Søren Rasted of Aqua and Hej Matematik.

== Post X Factor ==
After winning the X Factor, she was offered a major-label recording contract with Sony Music. Andrews made her major-label début with "Det Bedste Til Sidst" written by Søren Rasted of the Danish pop band Aqua. The song was released in April 2009, just after Andrews had debuted the song on the season finale of X Factor (along with "So What" by P!nk). A couple months after releasing "Det Bedste Til Sidst," Andrews made her full-length album début with Into the Light (2009), primarily in English. It peaked at number two on the Danish albums chart and had two singles "Into the Light" and "Mirror Mirror". In 2013, she provided backing vocals for Hannah Mancini who represented Slovenia in the Eurovision Song Contest 2013 with the song, "Straight into Love". In 2017, she was one of the backing vocalists for Anja Nissen who represented Denmark in the Eurovision Song Contest 2017 with the song, "Where I Am". In 2018, she made another return to the contest, this time as a member of the Danish jury.

== Discography ==
=== Studio albums ===
- 2008: Revelation
- 2009: Into the Light
- 2009: Husker du julen...
- 2009: Jólasangir
- 2011: Tænder et lys
- 2017: Linda Andrews
- 2019: Live at Studio 55
- 2020: Merry Christmas

=== Singles ===
- 2006: "Hot Santa"
- 2006: "Divalicious"
- 2009: "Det bedste til sidst"
- 2009: "Into the Light"
- 2009: "Mirror Mirror"
- 2009: '"Tænder et lys (Til du kommer hjem)"
- 2013: '"Tears"
- 2013: '"Never gonna let you down"
- 2013: '"Save Me" (TFX feat. Linda Andrews)
- 2013: '"Jeg gi'r dig tid"
- 2016: "Born again in your eyes"
- 2017 "Save your love for me"
- 2019 "Awake"

Preceded by Martin Hoberg Hedegaard	X Factor; Winner; 2009	Succeeded by Thomas Ring Petersen
