= Student loan deferment =

Student loan deferment is an agreement between the student and lender that the student may reduce or postpone repayment of a student loan for a designated period. Deferment or forbearance will prevent the loan from going into default, but may increase the overall cost of the loan. Students may be eligible for deferment while experiencing financial hardship or unemployment.

== See also ==
- Forbearance
