= Dax O'Callaghan =

English singer, dancer and actor

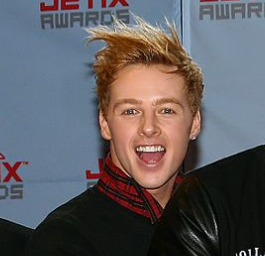
- Dax in 2008
- Born: Dax Jordache O'Callaghan; July 2, 1982 (age 43); London, England
- Occupation(s): Singer, actor, dancer
- Years active: Since 1996
- Known for: Lexington Bridge

Dax Jordache O'Callaghan (born 2 July 1982 in London, England) is an English singer, dancer and actor.

== Dancing and acting ==
O'Callaghan trained at the Sylvia Young Theatre School in London. O'Callaghan started working professionally at a young age and once named Prince de la Pop (the Prince of Pop) during his success as a recording artist in the European charts during the noughties. Featuring in many television series and commercials whilst still a child at school, aged 10 he ventured into Musical Theatre where he played the lead role Gavroche in London's West End musical Les Misérables at the Palace Theatre, before becoming the first person to play the role of the Artful Dodger in Cameron Mackintosh's production of Oliver! at the London Palladium where his cast would launch the musical to the public.

He appeared on television in EastEnders as Jack Price, Casualty, Hope and Glory, Trial by Jury and The Knock. Leaving school at 16, O'Callaghan went on to host Laugh Out Loud for Nickelodeon.

As a trained dancer an early dance career also emerged whilst at school, performing with The Spice Girls, SugaBabes, PJ & Duncan, TV show Live & Kicking, and the fashion company The Production Team in his early teens. When leaving school he went on to join world choreographer Wayne Sleep on the production of DASH as a featured dancer. at 16 years old Dax became the youngest ever teacher at the world famous Pineapple Studios with regular class. A record which still stands today.

In 2006, he then signed with Universal Records becoming one of five members in the new boyband Lexington Bridge, a mixed American-British act, that went on to achieve five number 1 hits across seven countries in Europe. Their 2007 release of the single "Real Man" featured American rap royalty Snoop Dogg. The band split in 2010 where O'Callaghan returned to the UK from living in Los Angeles and began choreographing for other artists.

Between 2010 and 2016 Dax became choreographer for Olly Murs, Ella Henderson, JLS, The Overtones (2014–2021, 6 UK Tours) Andrea Begley (winner of The Voice UK), MNEK and Jedward (creating their 2011 Eurovision entry for Ireland). Dax also worked as Assistant Choreographer for JLS on their UK arena tour (2012), Assistant Choreographer for the infamous T-Mobile flash-mob commercial at Heathrow Airport (2011) and in 2014 was guest Choreographer for the CBBC show The Next Step. During this time Dax also performed as a dancer for Little Mix (2012), X Factor Live shows (2009–2010), Alexandra Burke (2009) and for seven of JLS's UK Tours (2009–2014). In 2022 Dax choreographed the JLS music video Eternal Love.

From here he was called back into theatre as a director and choreographer for major cruise lines. Since 2016–2024 O'Callaghan would choreograph nine shows for Celebrity Cruise, seven productions for Marella Cruises, thirteen productions for Viking cruises, and six theatre shows for CFC Cruises (Compagnie Française de Criosières). During this period he won two Cruise Critic Awards for his choreography in the entertainment.

2023 saw Dax write and produce his own musical theatre show entitled CHASE, a contemporary pop-style musical. He would write the music to the original soundtrack, the script, and also choreographing the project, CHASE reached a 'table-read' stage which produced three sold-out shows presenting the writing and music at London's The Other Palace, performed by a professional West End cast.

O'Callaghan has been a guest judge for the European and International ASDU Dance Championships, and also the UDO World Street Dance Championships.

In 2018 he would launch the London dance space BASE Dance Studios. The premises would become the UK's most popular dance studios for public classes and a home for the entertainment industry supplying rehearsal space for the elite projects. In 2024 he would additionally purchase FlowDance Studios in central London, re-branding the business as UNI3 Studios. Owning two major public dance studios.

== Singing career ==
At 19 O'Callaghan signed as a solo recording artist with Warner International Record Company. His single "Calling Love" was successful in some European charts, particularly in France.

In 2008, O'Callaghan became choreographer for Germany's reality TV Show Popstars, working with the winning group named Room 2012.

From 2011 to 2015 O'Callaghan collaborated with Kensington Temple, London City Church, working to bring a modern style with music and stage performance and production within the UK Church.

== Music production ==
O'Callaghan has worked as a music producer for artists such as Kelly Rowland, JLS, Pixie Lott, Little Mix and Alexandra Burke, designing and remixing their music for TV performances and Arena tours. He has produced and designed music for fashion shows as well as award shows.

In 2011 he released his first UK single called "Broken", fronted by ex-EastEnders actor Mohammed George, which featured Dax O'Callaghan as well as being written by him. The song was co-produced with Jay-F (John Farmer) through a label they set up together for the UK release named 'D&J Music'. The song was used as an anthem for the Ben Kinsella Trust and all royalties from sales were donated to the charity helping the fight against knife crime within the UK.
