= Lexington Bridge (band) =

Musical group

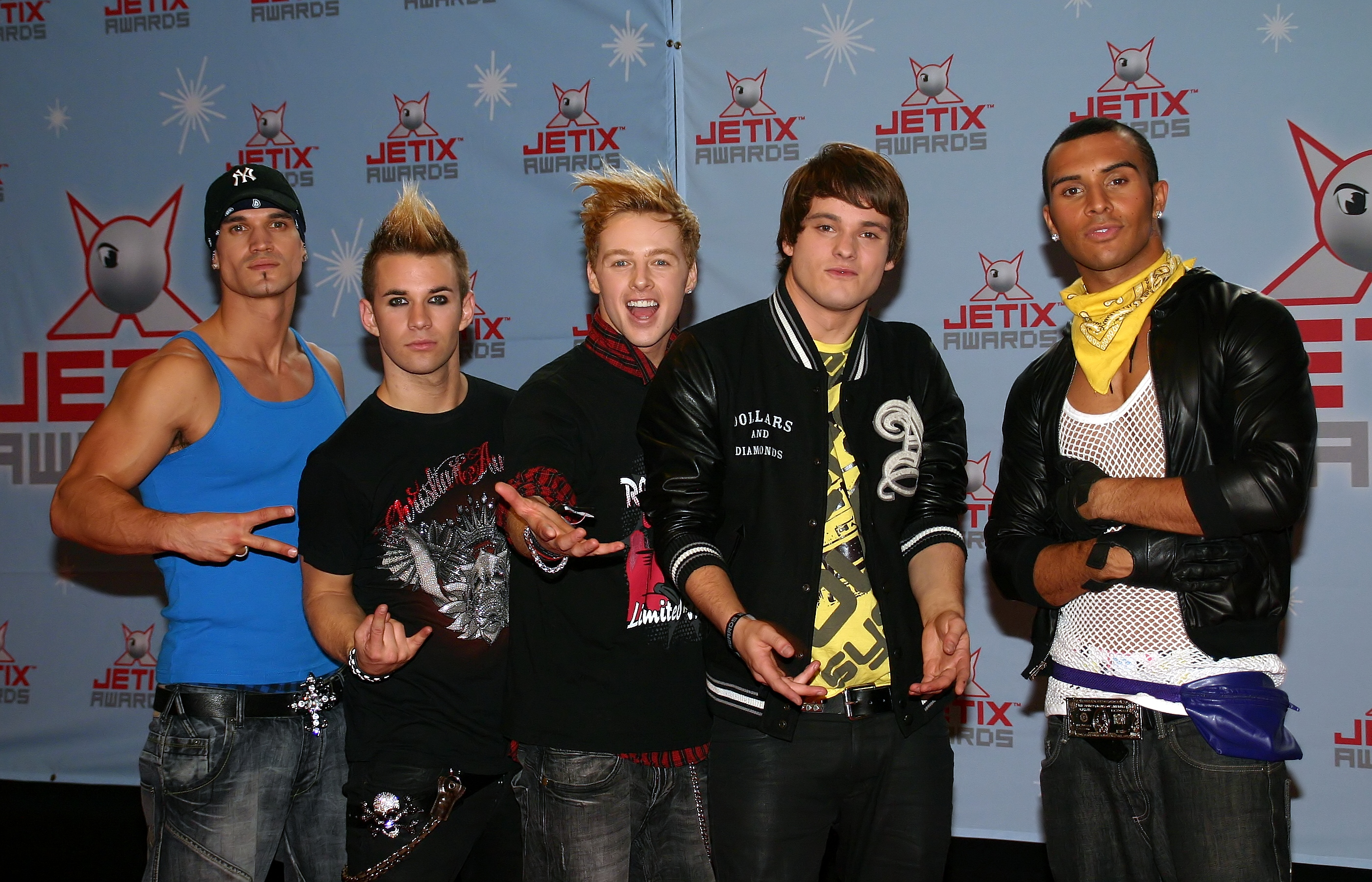
- Lexington Bridge in Berlin, 2008

Background information
- Also known as: LXB
- Origin: Germany
- Genres: pop, dance, R&B
- Years active: 2007–2010
- Labels: Polydor, Universal Music Group
- Members: Rob Uncles; Nye Oakley; Ephraim Beks; Dax O'Callaghan; Jerome Simeon

Lexington Bridge or otherwise known as LXB was put together in mid-2006 as a boy band by Universal Music after a worldwide search. The group consists of Rob Uncles from the US, Nye Oakley, Dax O'Callaghan and Jerome Simeon from the UK, and Ephraïm Beks from the Netherlands.

They owe their name to Lexington Avenue in New York City. On the other hand, Bridge alludes to the different countries, cultures, styles of the members and the musical elements such as pop, hip-hop, R&B, and Dance which they bridge together through the art of their music.

Musically, the five singers used elements from contemporary R&B, hip-hop, and pop.

== Members ==
- Robert Alexander Uncles
- Ephraim Beks
- Dax Jordache O'Callaghan
- Nye Oakley
- Jerome Paisley Simeon

== Career ==
In 2006, after a worldwide casting process with more than 5000 people from all over the world, Lexington Bridge was formed.

They became known in spring 2007 with their debut single "Kick Back".

On October 12, 2007, the second single "Real Man" came out in collaboration with the American rapper Snoop Dogg.

On November 23, 2007, they released their first album The Vibe. For their debut album, the band worked together with the top-of-the-line songwriters and producers such as Tim Hawes, (Sugababes, Atomic Kitten), Anthony President (Pink, Janet Jackson, Jamie Foxx), Qura Rankin (Christina Aguilera, Usher, Jennifer Lopez, Rihanna) and Marek Pompetzki & Paul NZA (Shaggy, Sido) and recorded their tracks in places including New York, Stockholm, Denmark, Berlin and Los Angeles.

Lexington Bridge was particularly successful on the European continent. In Germany, the band members achieved particular fame when they played as special guests on the Temptation Tour of Monrose. They also made it into the charts in countries such as Poland (top 5) and Bulgaria.

In early 2008, band member Nye, who was diagnosed with bulimia, took a break from the band until the beginning of June. In the summer he rejoined the band.

This was followed by a Europe-wide campaign for the young fashion company New Yorker. Lexington Bridge members were used as models for the fall 2008 campaign and for several months of advertisements and posters across Europe.

Their third single "Dance with Me" (in the Gold Edition) was released on October 24, 2008, and entered the German charts at number 20. The single also contains the Charity Foundation remix of "Go On and Go" and a rock version of this song because it was originally intended as a single.

On 25 May 2010 it was announced that the band had split.

== Discography ==
=== Albums ===
- 2007: The Vibe

=== Singles ===
Year	Song	AUT	BEL	GER	POR	POL
2007	"Kick Back"	28	18	24	24	2
2007	"Real Man" (feat. Snoop Dogg)	18	1	16	—	1
2007	"Everything I Am"	—	8	12	—	6
2008	"Go On and Go"	—	—	—	—	—
2008	"Dance With Me" (feat. Rocc Starr)	—	23	20	—	—

=== Music videos ===
Year	Title	Album
2007	"Kick Back"	The Vibe
2007	"Real Man"	The Vibe
2007	"Everything I Am"	The Vibe
2007	"I Just Can't Hate You"	The Vibe
2008	"Dance With Me"	
2008	"Sign Your Name"	
