= Bring It =

Bring It may refer to:

- "Snakes on a Plane (Bring It)", the song by Cobra Starship from the soundtrack album Snakes on a Plane: The Album
- "Bring It" (song), a 2011 single by English singer-songwriter Jodie Connor
- Bring It!, a 2009 album by Puffy
- Bring It! (TV series)
