= Gucci Gucci =

2011 single by Kreayshawn

Single by Kreayshawn

from the album Somethin' 'Bout Kreay
- Released: June 14, 2011
- Recorded: 2011
- Genre: Pop-rap
- Length: 3:07
- Label: Columbia
- Songwriters: Anthony David Negrete; Michael Kenneth Weiner; Natassia Zolot
- Producers: DJ Two Stacks; Adeptus

Kreayshawn singles chronology
"Bumpin' Bumpin" (2011)	"Gucci Gucci" (2011)	"Breakfast (Syrup)" (2012)

Music video
- "Gucci Gucci" on YouTube

"Gucci Gucci" is a song by American rapper Kreayshawn. The song serves as the lead single from her debut studio album, Somethin' 'Bout Kreay (2012). It was released on June 14, 2011, by Columbia Records. By 2012, the single had been certified gold by the Recording Industry Association of America.

The song was produced by DJ Two Stacks, who added the high hats and Adeptus. It contains a sample of another Kreayshawn song, titled "Bumpin Bumpin". "Gucci Gucci" peaked at number 57 on the US Billboard Hot 100 chart. The track was also a hit in Belgium, and charted on hip hop charts in the United Kingdom.

A remix was released featuring British rapper Giggs. British singer Neon Hitch covered the song.

== Background and composition ==
"Gucci Gucci" is a pop-rap song. In the song she proclaims her disdain for wearing designer brands such as Gucci, Louis Vuitton, Fendi, and Prada. The single gained popularity after being uploaded on her YouTube channel on May 16, 2011, the song garnered nearly 3 million views on YouTube in a little over two weeks. The song's success was able to get her a record deal with Columbia Records.

Kreayshawn wrote the song with hip-hop rapper and ghostwriter Anthony "Speak!" Negrete. In an August 2011 interview with Rebecca Haithcoat from LA Weekly, Negrete stated that he had never been paid royalties for his contributions.

== Critical reception ==
The song received rave reviews. Touré commented on the song: "The song basically attacks a central tenet of hip-hop: Many rappers embrace labelism as part of their celebration of upward mobility as well as a postmodern sentiment that you are the brands you wear." He also said that the song had "childishly simple rhyme patterns" such as "I'm lookin' like Madonna, but I'm flossin' like Ivana." James Montgomery of MTV ranked "Gucci Gucci" 23rd of his top 25 songs of 2011. The song was remixed by hip-hop rapper Lil Wayne for his mixtape Sorry 4 the Wait. The song is also ranked in Pitchfork's The Top 100 Tracks of 2011 and many other publications.

Publication	Accolade	Year	Rank
MTV	25 Best Songs of 2011	2011	No. 23
Pitchfork	The Top 100 Tracks of 2011	2011	No. 48
Complex	The 25 Best Songs of 2011	2011	No. 9
Popmatters	The 75 Best Songs of 2011	2011	No. 24

== Commercial performance ==
On the week of July 30, 2011, the song debuted on the Billboard Hot R&B/Hip-Hop Songs chart at number 83. It also debuted at number 82 on the Billboard Hot 100 on the week ending August 13, 2011. The single peaked at number 57 on the Hot 100.

In October 2012, the single was certified Gold by the RIAA, having sold 500,000 copies in the US.

"Gucci Gucci" was certified platinum by the RIAA in October 2023 for equivalent single sales in excess of 1 million units.

== Music video ==
The music video was directed by Joseph Zentil of Strange Customs. It features cameo appearances from former White Girl Mob member Lil Debbie, rapper Speak!, as well as Jasper Dolphin, Taco Bennett, and Left Brain of Odd Future.

== Track listing ==
"Gucci Gucci" – Digital EP
No.	Title	Writer(s)	Producer(s)	Length
1.	"Gucci Gucci"	N. Zolot; M. Weiner; A. Negrete	DJ Two Stacks	3:07
2.	"Gucci Gucci" (Two Stacks Remix)	N. Zolot; M. Weiner; A. Negrete	DJ Two Stacks	3:36
3.	"Gucci Gucci" (Giggs Remix)	N. Zolot; M. Weiner; A. Negrete; N. Thompson	DJ Two Stacks	3:07
4.	"Gucci Gucci" (Instrumental)		DJ Two Stacks	3:06
Total length:				12:56

== Charts ==
Chart (2011)	Peak position
Belgium (Ultratip Bubbling Under Flanders)	14
UK Hip Hop/R&B (Official Charts)	22
UK Singles (Official Charts)	77
US Billboard Hot 100	57
US Billboard Hot R&B/Hip-Hop Songs	62
US Billboard Rap Songs	18

== Certifications ==
Region	Certification	Certified units/sales
United States (RIAA)	Platinum	1,000,000^{‡}
^{‡} Sales+streaming figures based on certification alone.

== Release history ==
Country	Date	Format	Label	Ref
United States	July 14, 2011	Digital download	Sony Music Entertainment	
