= Duffy discography =

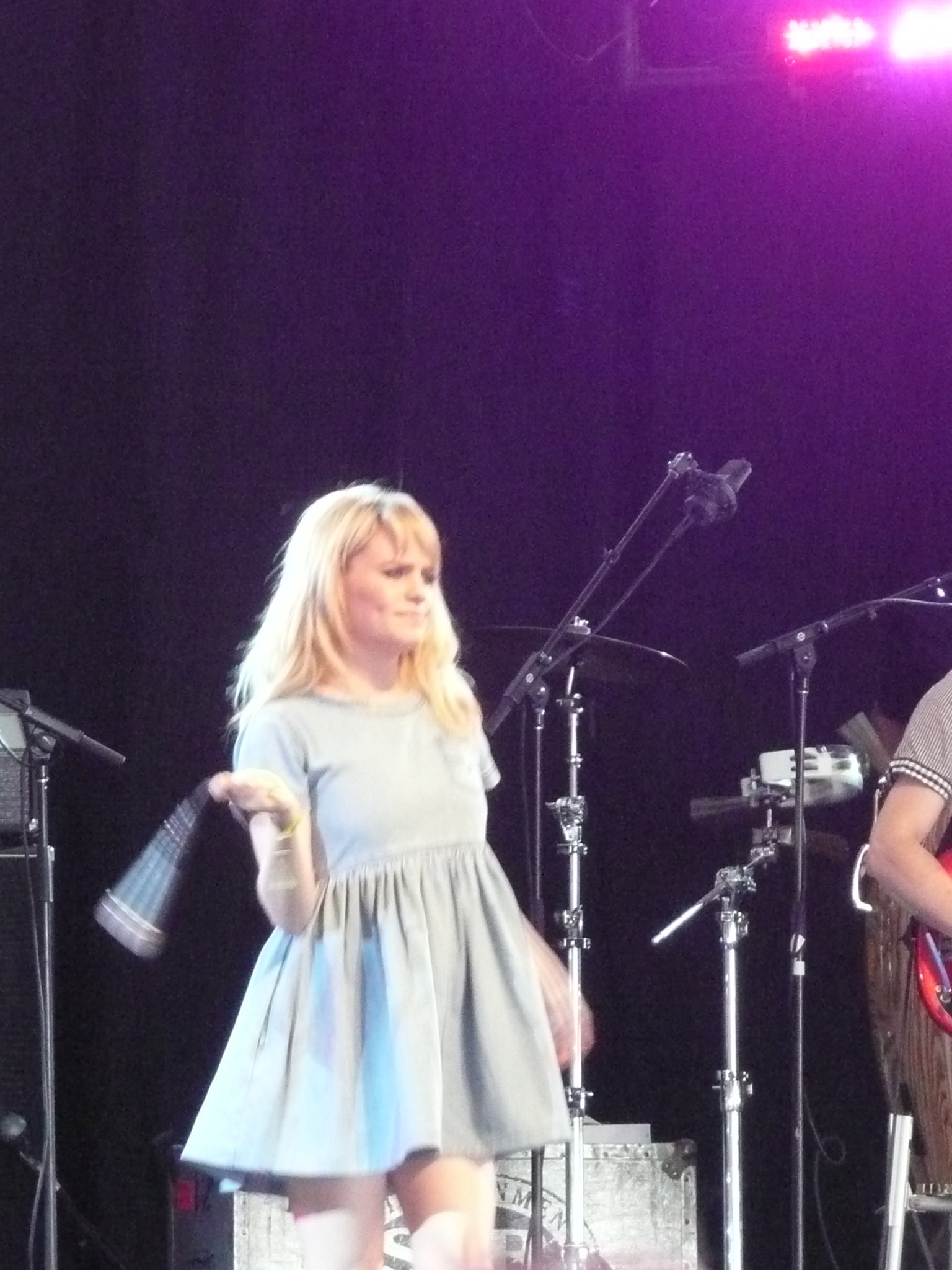
- Duffy performing at the 2008 Coachella Valley Music and Arts Festival
- Studio albums: 2
- Extended plays: 7
- Singles: 7
- Music videos: 7
- Promotional singles: 5
- Other appearances: 9

Welsh singer and songwriter Duffy has released two studio albums, six extended plays (under the name of Duffy) and one extended play (under the name of Aimée Duffy), seven singles and seven music videos. Her discography began with the release of one Welsh language extended play using her birth name, Aimée Duffy, and she has appeared on two soundtrack albums, as well as on a studio album by Mint Royale in 2004. Duffy's range of musical genres incorporates styles such as blue-eyed soul, pop and pop rock. Aimée Duffy, her debut extended play (EP), was released in 2004 by Welsh music label Recordiau Awen Records, following her success on the Welsh talent show WawFfactor in 2003. Following this release, a performance of Richard J. Parfitt's "Oh Boy" brought her to the attention of Duffy's former manager, Jeanette Lee of Rough Trade Records.

Her debut single, "Rockferry", was released in late 2007, and charted at number 45 on the UK Singles Chart. Her follow-up single, "Mercy", was internationally released, charting inside the top ten on 15 international singles charts, as well as reaching number one on eight of these. "Mercy" was the third-biggest-selling single of 2008 in the United Kingdom. This came after staying at number one on the UK Singles Chart for five weeks. Duffy's debut album Rockferry, was released on 3 March 2008, and became the biggest selling album of that year in the UK. Her follow-up singles, "Warwick Avenue" and "Stepping Stone", did not replicate her early success, although they still sold well; for example "Warwick Avenue" charted at number 3 on the UK Singles Chart. Her fifth single, "Rain on Your Parade", was released in December 2008. Rockferry was the fourth-best-selling album of 2008 worldwide, according to the International Federation of the Phonographic Industry, and since its release the album has sold over six million copies worldwide. The album won the Grammy Award for Best Pop Vocal Album at the 51st Annual Grammy Awards.

Duffy released her second album, titled Endlessly on 29 November 2010, which to date has charted in most major markets. The lead single from the album, "Well, Well, Well", was released on 21 November 2010. Duffy also contributed to the films soundtracks of The Boat That Rocked, Patagonia and Legend.

== Studio albums ==
Title	Details	Peak chart positions										Sales	Certifications (sales thresholds)
Title	Details	UK	AUT	DEN	GER	IRE	NL	NZ	SWE	SWI	US	Sales	Certifications (sales thresholds)
Rockferry	Released: 3 March 2008; Label: A&M (#175 642–3); Format: CD, digital download, LP	1	2	1	3	1	2	1	1	1	4	World: 9,000,000 (as of 2016); UK: 2,230,000 (as of 2021)	EU: 4× Platinum; UK: 7× Platinum; AUS: 2× Platinum; AUT: Platinum; DEN: 4× Platinum; GER: 4× Gold; IRL: 3× Platinum; NZ: 3× Platinum; SWE: Platinum; SWI: 3× Platinum; US: Gold
Endlessly	Released: 29 November 2010; Label: A&M; Format: CD, digital download	9	17	2	15	3	6	19	4	10	72	UK: 205,000 (as of 2021)	UK: Gold; DEN: Gold; SWE: Gold; SWI: Gold

== Extended plays ==
Title	Details
Aimée Duffy (Note: Aimée Duffy was released under the name of Aimée Duffy, Duffy's birth name.)	Released: 2004; Label: Awen; Format: CD, digital download
Live from London (Note: Live From London and Live at the Theatre of Living Arts were released exclusively to the iTunes Store.)	Released: 25 February 2008; Label: Polydor, Mercury; Format: Digital download
FNMTV Live (Note: FNMTV Live was released exclusively to Rhapsody.com.)	Released: 2008; Label: Mercury; Format: Digital download
Deluxe EP	Released: 3 February 2009; Label: Mercury; Format: CD, digital download
Live at the Theater of Living Arts – 6 August 2008	Released: 23 November 2009; Label: Polydor; Format: Digital download
Spotify Session (Note: Spotify Session is only available to stream online through the Spotify music player platform.)	Released: 2010; Label: Polydor; Format: Online streaming
NRJ Live Sessions: Duffy	Released: 4 February 2011; Label: Polydor; Format: Digital download

== Singles ==
Title	Year	Peak chart positions										Certifications	Album
Title	Year	UK	AUT	DEN	GER	IRE	NL	NZ	SWE	SWI	US	Certifications	Album
"Rockferry"	2007	45	—	—	—	—	—	—	—	35	—		Rockferry
"Mercy"	2008	1	1	2	1	1	1	4	3	1	27	UK: 2× Platinum; AUS: Platinum; DEN: 2× Platinum; GER: Platinum; NZ: Gold; SWI: Gold; US: Platinum	Rockferry
"Warwick Avenue"	2008	3	17	7	12	11	9	15	16	12	—	UK: Platinum; DEN: Platinum	Rockferry
"Stepping Stone"	2008	21	—	18	—	41	34	—	—	49	—		Rockferry
"Rain on Your Parade"	2008	15	29	—	29	50	38	—	32	25	—		Rockferry
"Well, Well, Well"	2010	41	33	24	24	26	16	—	60	19	—		Endlessly
"—" denotes a single that did not chart or was not released.

=== Promotional singles ===
Title	Year	Album
"Endlessly" (Note: North America only.)	2010	Endlessly
"Keeping My Baby" (Note: Scandinavia only.)	2011	Endlessly
"My Boy" (Note: Cancelled single.)	2011	Endlessly

== Other charted songs ==
Title	Year	Peak chart positions	Album
Title	Year	UK	Album
"Oh Boy"	2008	96	"Rockferry" (single)
"Tomorrow"	2008	192	"Mercy" (single)
"Hanging on Too Long"	2008	193	Rockferry
"Delayed Devotion"	2008	166	Rockferry
"Syrup & Honey"	2008	142	Rockferry
"I'm Scared"	2008	172	Rockferry
"Distant Dreamer"	2008	187	Rockferry
"Live and Let Die"	2009	131	War Child Presents Heroes

== Other appearances ==
Title	Year	Album
"Something New" (with Mint Royale)	2005	See You in the Morning
"Little Words" (with Mint Royale)	2005	See You in the Morning
"Live and Let Die"	2009	War Child Heroes Vol. 1
"Stay with Me Baby"	2009	The Boat That Rocked
"Desearía"	2011	Patagonia
"Ar Lan y Môr"	2011	Patagonia
"Whole Lot of Love"	2015	Legend
"Are You Sure?"	2015	Legend
"Make the World Go Away"	2015	Legend

== Music videos ==
Title	Year	Director
"Rockferry"	2007	Joseph Bull
"Mercy"	2008	Daniel Wolfe
"Warwick Avenue"	2008	Daniel Wolfe
"Mercy" (U.S. version)	2008	Adria Petty
"Stepping Stone"	2008	Sophie Muller
"Rain on Your Parade"	2008	Sophie Muller
"Well, Well, Well"	2010	Chris Cottam

- Live versions of seven songs from Endlessly recorded at the Café de Paris were also released as music videos. A video was filmed for the prospective single "My Boy", but was never released.
