= List of awards and nominations received by Duffy =

Duffy awards and nominations
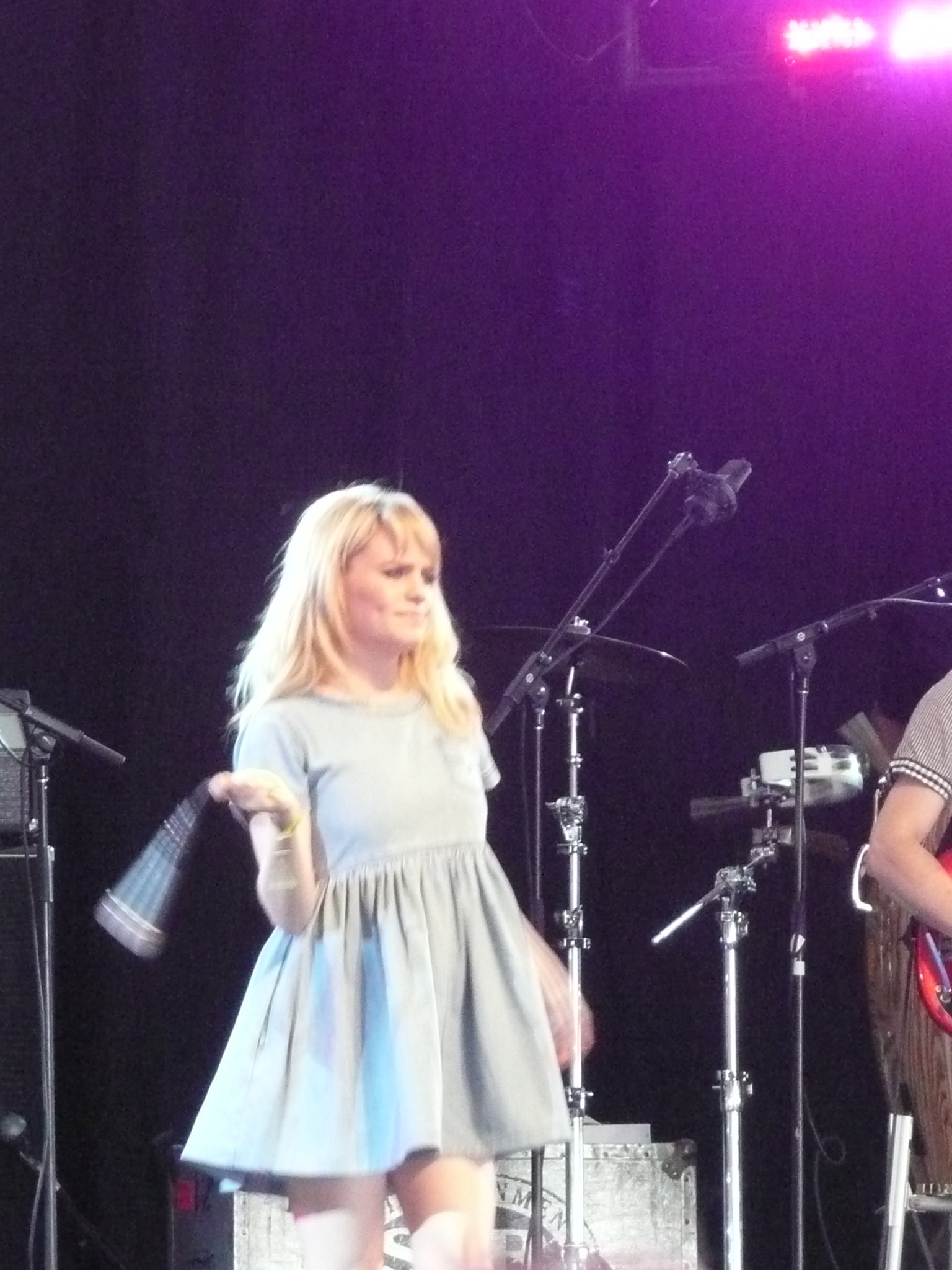
- Duffy performing at the 2008 Coachella Valley Music and Arts Festival
Awards and nominations
Award	Wins	Nominations
Brit	3	5
Echo	0	1
Grammy	1	3
Ivor Novello	1	3
Meteor Music	1	1
MOBO	0	1
Mojo	1	2
MTV Europe	0	3
MTV VMA	0	1
NRJ	0	2
Q	1	2
World Music	0	2
Music Producers Guild Awards	0	1
Nickelodeon Kid's Choice Awards UK	0	1
UK Festival Awards	0	2
Urban Music Awards	0	2
Vodafone Live Awards	0	1

Totals (Note: Certain award groups do not simply award one winner. They acknowledge several different recipients, have runners-up, and have third place. Since this is a specific recognition and is different from losing an award, runner-up mentions are considered wins in this award tally. For simplification and to avoid errors, each award in this list has been presumed to have had a prior nomination.)
- Wins: 12
- Nominations: 33

Duffy is a Welsh singer-songwriter from Nefyn, Wales. She has released two studio albums, entitled Rockferry & Endlessly respectively. The former album and its singles have amassed various awards, due to the critical success of her freshman effort. Rockferry and her worldwide successful single "Mercy" were nominated for three Grammy Awards in 2008. The former won the award for Best Pop Vocal Album at the 2009 ceremony for those awards.

== BRIT Awards ==
Year	Ceremony	Title	Result
2008	Critics' Choice Award	Duffy	Nominated
2009	British Breakthrough Act	Duffy	Won
2009	British Female Solo Artist	Duffy	Won
2009	British Single of the Year	"Mercy"	Nominated
2009	British Album of the Year	Rockferry	Won
2010	British Album of 30 Years	Rockferry	Nominated

== BMI Pop Music Awards ==
Year	Category	Title	Result
2009	BMI Honours Song	Mercy	Won

== Echo Music Awards ==
Year	Ceremony	Category	Title	Result
2009	Echo Music Awards 2009	Best International Female Artist	Duffy	Nominated
2009	Echo Music Awards 2009	Best International Newcomer	Duffy	Nominated
2009	Echo Music Awards 2009	Best International Single	Duffy - "Mercy"	Nominated

== Fonogram Awards ==
Year	Category	Title	Result
2009	Best International Pop/Rock Album	Duffy	Won

== Gaygalan Awards ==
Since 1999, the Gaygalan Awards are a Swedish accolade presented by the QX magazine. Duffy has received one nomination.

Year	Nominee / work	Award	Result	Ref.
2009	"Mercy"	International Song of the Year	Nominated	

== Glamour Women of the Year Awards ==
Year	Category	Title	Result
2009	Best UK Solo Artist	Duffy	Nominated

== Grammy Awards ==
Year	Nominated Work	Category	Result
2009	Herself	Best New Artist	Nominated
2009	"Mercy"	Best Female Pop Vocal Performance	Nominated
2009	Rockferry	Best Pop Vocal Album	Won

== Hit FM Music Awards ==
Year	Nominee / work	Award	Result	Ref.
2009	Herself	Best New Artist	Nominated	
2009	Herself	Best Female Artist	Nominated	
2009	Herself	Most Faddish Artist	Nominated	
2009	"Mercy"	Song of the Year	Nominated	
2009	"Warwick Avenue"	Song of the Year	Nominated	

== Ivor Novello Awards ==
Year	Ceremony	Category	Title	Result
2009	54th Ivor Novello Awards	PRS for Most Performed Work	"Mercy"	Won
2009	54th Ivor Novello Awards	Best-selling British song	"Mercy"	Nominated
2009	54th Ivor Novello Awards	Album Award	Rockferry	Nominated

== Los Premios 40 Principales ==
Year	Category	Work	Result
2008	Best International Artist	Duffy	Nominated
2008	Best International Song	Mercy	Nominated

== Meteor Ireland Music Awards ==
Year	Ceremony	Category	Title	Result
2009	Meteor Ireland Awards 2009	Best International Female	Duffy	Won

== MOBO Awards ==
Year	Ceremony	Category	Title	Result
2008	MOBO Awards 2008	Best UK Female	Duffy	Nominated

== MOJO Awards ==
Year	Ceremony	Category	Title	Result
2008	MOJO Awards 2008	Song of the Year	"Mercy"	Won
2008	MOJO Awards 2008	Album of the Year	Rockferry	Nominated
2008	MOJO Awards 2008	Best Breakthrough Act	Duffy	Nominated

== Music Producers Guild Awards ==
Year	Ceremony	Category	Title	Result
2009	Music Producers Guild Awards	Single of the Year	"Mercy"	Nominated
2009	Music Producers Guild Awards	Album of the Year	"Rockferry"	Nominated

== MTV ==
=== MTV Europe Awards ===
Year	Ceremony	Category	Result
2008	Rockferry	Album of the Year	Nominated
2008	"Mercy"	Most Addictive Track	Nominated
2008	Duffy	"New Act"	Nominated
2008	Duffy	"Best UK Act"	Nominated

=== MTV Music Video Awards ===
Year	Ceremony	Category	Title	Result
2008	Music Video Awards 2008	Best UK Video	"Warwick Avenue" (music video)	Nominated

=== MTV Video Music Japan Awards ===
Year	Category	Title	Result
2009	Best New International Artist	Duffy	Nominated

== Nickelodeon Kid's Choice Awards ==
=== United Kingdom ===
Year	Ceremony	Category	Title	Result
2008	Kid's Choice Awards 2008 (UK)	Best singer	Duffy	Nominated

== NRJ Music Awards ==
Year	Ceremony	Category	Title	Result
2009	NRJ Music Awards 2009	International Revelation	Duffy	Nominated
2009	NRJ Music Awards 2009	International Album of the Year	Rockferry	Nominated

== Oye! Awards ==
Year	Ceremony	Title	Result
2008	Best New Artist	Duffy	Nominated

== Q Awards ==
Year	Ceremony	Category	Title	Result
2008	Q Awards 2008	Breakthrough Act	Duffy	Won
2008	Q Awards 2008	Best Track	"Mercy"	Nominated

== Rockbjörnen Awards ==
Year	Category	Title	Result
2009	Best Foreign Artist	Duffy	Won

== Sound of... ==
BBC annual poll
	Ceremony	Category	Result
2008	Sound of... awards	Sound of 2008	Second

== Swiss Music Awards ==
Year	Ceremony	Category	Title	Result
2009	Swiss Music Awards	Best Song International	Mercy	Nominated
2009	Swiss Music Awards	Best Newcomer International	Duffy	Nominated

== UK Festival Awards ==
Year	Ceremony	Category	Title	Result
2008	UK Festival Awards 2008	Festival Pop Act	Duffy	Nominated
2008	UK Festival Awards 2008	Best Newcomer Award	Duffy	Nominated

== Urban Music Awards ==
Year	Ceremony	Category	Title	Result
2008	Urban Music Awards	Best Neo-soul Act	Duffy	Nominated
2008	Urban Music Awards	Most Inspiring Act	Duffy	Nominated

== Vodafone Live Music Awards ==
Year	Ceremony	Category	Title	Result
2008	Live Music Awards 2008	Best Female	Duffy	Nominated

== World Music Awards ==
Year	Ceremony	Category	Title	Result
2008	2008 World Music Awards	World's Best Pop/Rock; Female Artist	Duffy	Nominated
2008	2008 World Music Awards	World's Best New Artist	Duffy	Nominated

== Other recognition ==
- Honorary fellowship, awarded by the Bangor University.

Awards and achievements
Preceded by Back to Black by Amy Winehouse	Best-selling album of the year (United Kingdom); 2008	Succeeded by incumbent
Preceded by Back to Black by Amy Winehouse	Grammy Award for Best Pop Vocal Album; 2009	Succeeded by incumbent
