= Endlessly (Duffy album) =

Studio album by Duffy
- Released: 26 November 2010
- Recorded: 2009–2010
- Studios: MSR Studios NYC, United States, Cake Studio, Sacramento; British Grove Studios; Sotogrande Studios, Spain
- Genres: Pop; dance-pop; soul
- Length: 33:52
- Labels: A&M (UK); Mercury; Def Jam (US)
- Producers: Aimée Duffy; Albert Hammond

Duffy chronology
Deluxe EP (2009)	Endlessly (2010)

Singles from Endlessly
- 1. "Well, Well, Well" Released: 19 October 2010

Endlessly is the second studio album by Welsh singer Duffy. It was released in the United Kingdom on 26 November 2010 by A&M Records (under Polydor) and in the United States on 7 December 2010 by Mercury Records and Def Jam Recordings. Duffy worked almost exclusively with Albert Hammond Snr. on the album, with all but one of the album's songs being written by Hammond and Duffy. Four of the songs received additional or co-production by Stuart Price. Music is also provided by The Roots and Questlove. Musically, the album follows the soul stylings of her first album Rockferry (2008), although Duffy drew inspiration from a variety of other genres, including disco and soft rock, and was compared to pop singers such as Kylie Minogue.

The album received mixed reviews, with critics stating that Duffy faltered outside of her comfort zone, although it was called a "proper sophomore effort", and was often compared to Rockferry, in terms of both commercial and critical performance. Vocally, Duffy's falsetto and vibrato were both criticised and praised, being called "delicious to some and cloying to others." Commercially, it did not replicate Duffy's success with her debut, reaching just number seventy-two on the US Billboard 200. Nevertheless, Endlessly reached the top ten in Denmark, Finland, Greece, the Netherlands, Sweden, Switzerland and the United Kingdom. It has been certified gold in four European countries including in the United Kingdom.

The only single from Endlessly, titled "Well, Well, Well", did not perform well on national charts, and was only a modest European success, reaching a peak of thirty-seven on the European Hot 100 Singles chart and number forty-one in the UK. The single features a rhythm section by United States hip hop group The Roots. Duffy promoted the album extensively throughout the world, performing on many television shows and conducting an array of print interviews. A live extended play (EP) of songs from the album was released in Germany in 2011 and plans for a concert tour were listed as "coming soon" on Duffy's website. However, shortly after the release of the album, it was announced that Duffy would be taking an indefinite hiatus from the music industry, and the planned second single from Endlessly – "My Boy" – was cancelled, though a single mix of the title track was digitally released. The album is not available on any streaming service such as Spotify.

== Background ==
In March 2008, Welsh singer Aimée Ann Duffy released her debut studio album, Rockferry, under the mononym Duffy. The blue-eyed soul album went on to be the best-selling album of 2008 in the UK, whilst the International Federation of the Phonographic Industry named it the fourth biggest seller worldwide of that year. The album also won the Grammy Award for Best Pop Vocal Album at the American 51st Annual Grammy Awards. Following the release of the album's final single, "Rain on Your Parade" in November 2008, Duffy began work on her second album, aiming to enlist the help of different producers from Rockferry, to create a different sound profile than she had previously used.

In late January 2010 Rough Trade Management, who with Jeanette Lee had managed Duffy throughout the course of Rockferry's release, announced that they and the singer had parted amicably with the company. Duffy's new management said that "professional relationship between Duffy and Rough Trade management has run its course." Duffy was quoted by Billboard as saying, "It just felt as though the relationship [with Lee] had run its course, [as] what we had set out to do, we'd done—I was developed, established, and I had to think: 'OK, so what now?'". Duffy was then represented by Angela Becker of London-based Becker Brown Management.

== Recording ==
In January, one Billboard article reported on the development of the record, being the first to reveal that Duffy was working with "veteran songwriter" Albert Hammond as well as The Roots drummer Questlove, whose group she had previously admired for their work on their remix of her song "Mercy" (2008). I The magazine stated that the material it had heard "feels like it was born in 1963 and is much in the vein of the Dusty Springfield-inspired soul [...] [on] Rockferry". Duffy talked to MusicOMH about her collaboration with Hammond, saying;

It was good for me, because I really needed to prove to myself that I didn't get lucky. I needed to put pen to paper and see that I could do it all again, to see that it was easy for me, and I have to admit it was so reassuring. Albert and I wrote all these songs, about 25 songs in 12 days, pouring out of me. I needed that connection again, with what it is you know me for! I think he was quite fascinated with me, because he'd been introduced to me as a fan. He saw me on American television, and approached me appreciating what I did. He didn't treat me like an unknown, trying to tell me what he thought was best for me. Instead he met me as somebody established, and so it was like he instilled me with lots of faith and belief in myself, that I was good at what I did! Because he appreciated what I did, he encouraged me to bring out the best in myself.

The album was primarily recorded at recording studios MSR Studios NYC, Cake Studio, British Grove Studios and the Sotogrande Studios in New York, London and Spain over the course of three weeks, although sessions also took place throughout 2009 and 2011; Duffy had been recording songs she had written using her computer and iPod since the release of Rockferry, some of which remained in demo form until the final stages of the recording process. Duffy had formed a songwriting partnership with Albert Hammond for the record, which resulted in nine of the ten final songs released being written, composed and produced by Duffy and Hammond together. Aside from her partnership with Hammond, Duffy also forged collaborative efforts with other musicians who she felt reflected the sound change she was aiming for, including hip hop group The Roots. Duffy said in an interview that their involvement would be limited to "a rhythm section" going on to say "if you know The Roots you will know just how cool [that] is. I love them and they are so cool." She was also heavily involved with the recording process. The Daily Telegraph reports that often Duffy was a perfectionist regarding her songs, and that she often stayed in the studio with her mix engineer to ensure the composition sounded exactly as she wanted. This was often done without the help of Hammond, and she was quoted "this is all I care about. I keep a tight rein when it comes to quality control." Billboard reported in November later that year that Duffy had experimented with a new dance sound, confirming that neither Bernard Butler nor Steve Booker, who produced the bulk of Duffy's debut album, Rockferry, had returned for the record.

== Music and lyrics ==
Endlessly consists of ten songs which take influence from a variety of genres across different musical spectrums. AllMusic said that the album marked a transition from "Dusty Springfield-like ingenue" on Rockferry to "Kylie Minogue-ish diva." This point of view was echoed by several other reviewers. Inkeeping with this, Endlessly was said to have experimented with a new dance sound, "rigorously maintain[ing] a 1:1 ratio between dance tracks and ballads". The album's first single, "Well, Well, Well", was said to have achieved this particularly well, as it emulates "a sassier, brassier Duffy". Uncut noted that the album could be split into two-halves according to the "opposing moods" it contains–"saucy, sexed-up spin[s] around the dancefloor" and "soaring, superior ballads". Nevertheless, a sound similar to Rockferry was created in the form of "Too Hurt to Dance" and "Hard for the Heart", both of which were compared to the work of Springfield. In 2010, Billboard magazine was favourable in its preview of the album, introducing what it called the "funk-fueled" "My Boy", disco-esque "Lovestruck" and string-fuelled pop of "Keeping My Baby". Overall, the album was said to "have the same sassy, soulful pop hooks", as her debut album, albeit with more maturity and "raw" pop vibe.

Lyrically, the album is an array of love songs, with songs such as "My Boy" and "Girl" portraying Duffy in a protective manner, with respect to her lover. On "Breath Away", Duffy laments that her lover is "taking her breath away." "Hard for the Heart" questions the difficulties involved with falling in love.

== Songs ==
The album's first song, "My Boy", opens to crowd noise, engineered by Brendan Reilly and Aaron Sokell. Described as "one of the few songs to sound as though it emerged from the 21st century", it was said to be a reference point and introduction to the "classic girl group sound" seen on Endlessly, and a combination of the two aforementioned styles. As with the rest of the album, it was written and produced by Duffy and Hammond. It was praised for its use of keyboards and percussion, played by Hammond, said to "sound like piano's laughing", and "creating a preponderance of beats that dig themselves into your brain", respectively. Lyrically, Duffy sings of "the completely rude and judgemental comments made about her relationship with a significantly younger gentleman." The next song, titled "Too Hurt to Dance", was called a "grand glitterball ballad", and is inspired by the music of the 1950s. Q named it the ninth best song of December 2010, whilst Kitty Empire of The Observer was critical of Duffy's voice on the song, noting that her "quacking patent-leather vocal" was of prevalence. This was in contrast to the disco music displayed in "Keeping My Baby", which again received comparisons to the music of Minogue. Originally intended to be the second single released from the album, it was said to omit a tango style, and was both positively and negatively received by critics. As lyrically it is sung from the point of view of a pregnant girl, it was compared to the song "Papa Don't Preach" (1986) by Madonna. The single "Well, Well, Well" follows. Said to debut Duffy's "inner diva", the song, like "Mercy" (2008) is heavily influenced with Northern Soul, aided by a rhythm section provided by The Roots. Duffy was able too secure their part in the song and others on the album through telephoning the president of Island Def Jam Records, LA Reid. It was negatively reviewed by the BBC Chart Blog, as despite its provocative lyrics and challenging nature, "it basically has one idea, one note, one refrain, and it stops and it starts and it repeats and repeats and repeats like someone is prodding and prodding at your chest." The reviewer continued that the song was "monumentally irritating", a sentiment that several reviewers echoed. Elsewhere, it was described as an "instant classic".

Three downtempo ballads follow, called "the kind of songs you wouldn't want to listen to at all: the lyrics are boring at best and completely cliché at worst" by one reviewer. The first, "Don't Forsake Me" is a torch song that was frequently compared to "Too Hurt to Dance" due to its lyrics about heartache. The song follows the retro sound Duffy had been previously known for and was called "indebted to the pre-Beatles era". It was received negatively for "paint[ing] too much of a resemblance" to "Warwick Avenue". The title song, which follows, is a love song that was again said to contain 1950s music references. The song features vinyl sounds and is sung to the accompaniment of an acoustic guitar. The final song in the trio of ballads is "Breath Away", a 1960s-inspired ballad about love. Contactmusic.com implied that the song is boring, saying that "[it] hardly does anything to take our breath away", although it was said to "showcase" her vocal talents. Endlessly continues with two more up-tempo songs with a dance-orientated sound: "Lovestruck" and "Girl", both called "sassy" and "playful". The former is a disco song described as having "the brashness of a Bond theme", with "tragic undertones" of a "haunting creation". Lyrically, the song speaks of being so in love you are "sleepless all night long", with the song opening "It's a physical thing we got and I'm in paradise". The lyrical sentiment of "My Boy" is echoed in the latter, with the song being sung "Girl, girl/Stay away, girl/Come back another day, girl/Better still don't come back ever stay away from here forever." The album's final song, the string-led "Hard for the Heart" continues the soul pop sound of Rockferry and was described as a "soulful pop confection" by Uncut, whilst being labelled as the stand-out song on the album by many reviewers. The song's climax was compared to the song "Hey Jude" (1968) by The Beatles, whilst a reviewer for the BBC asserted that it "unconsciously borrows from Coldplay's "The Scientist"." Entertainment Focus, on the other hand called it a "lost Burt Bacharach classic", and Hammond's production skills were also praised on the song. It also received praise concerning Duffy's voice, something that was a feature of many critics' reviews, with Sputnik Music noting, ""Hard for the Heart" [...] has the singer in an intensely emotional and surprisingly restrained moment. Her beautiful timbre finally gets to shine without choking out the sophisticated and apotheotic production, giving pulse and strength to a strikingly poetic composition."

== Release and artwork ==
On 16 September 2010, Duffy announced the release of the album, set for 28 November 2010 to digital outlets in the UK, with a physical CD to be released the following day. It was also announced that the Endlessly's first single "Well, Well, Well" would be released one week prior. Mercury Records president David Massey said of the album's release, "Her fans will see it as a natural evolution of her last record. The strength of the record, the fan base that she has already adopted and the opportunity to have multiple singles means we can go further with this record than the last." Fifteen seconds of "Well, Well, Well" were released onto the internet in anticipation of its release, whilst the song leaked in full in October 2010. The title track, "Endlessly", was made available for download before the album's release in North America after it was made available for streaming online, and a "single mix" of the track also came to fruition. The album was released in Germany on 26 November 2010 by both Polydor and Universal Music, and in the United States by Mercury Records on 7 December. The Japanese release, scheduled for 2011, was expected to include bonus tracks.

"Well, Well, Well" was released as the album's lead single worldwide in October 2010. It was the album's only commercially released single, reaching peaks of number forty-one on the UK Singles Chart and thirty-seven on the European Hot 100 Singles chart. In mainland Europe, it managed to chart in the top twenty in Finland, Belgium and Switzerland, reaching number eleven in the former. A music video was filmed in Oxford and directed by Chris Cottam to complement the release. The single was promoted extensively as part of a campaign of "major TV moments", taking in the UK, the United States as well as seven countries around Europe in 2010 and 2011. A single mix of "Endlessly" was released as a promotional single and was available for download from the album prior to Endlessly's release in North America only.

A second full single release was planned for the songs "Endlessly", "Keeping My Baby" and finally "My Boy" in 2011, and a music video was filmed for the latter in February 2011. A clip of the prospective B-side to the "My Boy" release, "Tell Me", was released on the Internet and a single edit of "My Boy" was produced for the release by Tom Elmhirst. The release was scheduled for 13 March 2011 in the UK. However, the single was removed from pre-order on digital outlets and the release was cancelled following Duffy's announcement of a career hiatus. The song's music video or B-side have not been released.

The album's cover and its associated promotional images were shot by photographer Lachlan Bailey. The cover image itself is cropped from a larger version, in which Duffy is seen to be in a cafe holding a coffee cup. Sputnikmusic said that "the crimson themed cover will draw in curious listeners one after another" and that it "can be nice to stare at". musicOMH was more negative, saying that it "looks like it ought to be adorning the latest Littlewoods catalogue", noting that it did not fit with Duffy's plan to "move her sound away from the middle of the road."

== Critical reception ==
Professional ratings
Aggregate scores
Source	Rating
Metacritic	59/100
Review scores
Source	Rating
AllMusic	3/5 stars
The A.V. Club	C−
Chicago Tribune	1.5/4 stars
Entertainment Weekly	B
The Guardian	3/5 stars
Los Angeles Times	3/4 stars
Paste	6.8/10
Rolling Stone	2.5/5 stars
Slant Magazine	1.5/5 stars
Spin	7/10

Upon its release, Endlessly received generally mixed reviews from most music critics. At Metacritic, which assigns a normalised rating out of 100 to reviews from mainstream critics, the album received an average score of 59, based on 21 reviews, which indicates "mixed or average reviews". John Bush from AllMusic, giving the album three stars, stated that the album did not have "anything close to the power and elegance of Rockferry." Melissa Maerz of Entertainment Weekly commended her choice to collaborate with Albert Hammond, stating that he was able to bring out "her inner pop star" on the record. Maerz noted "Lovestruck" and "Girl" were amongst her favourite tracks. Will Dean of The Guardian held a similar position, in one of the more positive reviews for the album arguing that "Albert Hammond's production [...] make[s] the LP a pleasant listen." Similarly, a BBC Music reviewer praised the "rich, crisp production values" but ended by saying it is "too slight and uneven to impress unconditionally" and that Hammond's collaboration with Duffy "reaps only minor rewards." Rolling Stone called the collection "tasteful, well-made and kind of dull." Matthew Cole of Slant Magazine, giving the album one and a half stars out of five, said that "after 10 tracks of Endlessly, I was just begging her to stop", referencing her earlier hit "Mercy".

However, some critics were more positive towards the album. Okayplayer noted that the songs "capture a retro American sound reminiscent of sock hops and drive-ins so subtly, that the album could have been called Effortlessly." Uncut said that it is "sharp, commercially astute pop music" that is "cool and clever without being contrived." Ann Powers of the Los Angeles Times notes that Duffy "tries several different ways to celebrate her unique talents without abandoning the vintage settings that won her such acclaim", calling the lead single a "reggae-tinged rocker" and complementing the return to Rockferry-like Northern Soul on tracks like "Too Hurt to Dance." However, she goes on to write that "Duffy has said she wrote the songs in a mere three weeks, and it shows."

Many were critical about Duffy's voice on the record. John Bush of AllMusic said that "Duffy's voice [...] has not improved with age, or simply isn't portrayed well here." He goes on to say that it is "clearly not her most potent weapon", criticising her choice to "build an album out of it." Matthew Cole of Slant Magazine said that "the bigger problem with Endlessly is that Duffy compensates for her lack of a star persona by overdrawing her syrupy rasp, already noted for its acquired tastiness, into a cartoonish oddity." Spin noted that ultimately, it's the vocals that carry Endlessly. There's no whitewashing of the singer's eccentricities, which feel more pronounced here—she can be gruffly nasal (the oft-repeated chorus of "Well, Well, Well" never stops sounding like "whale, whale, whale") while remaining wholly beguiling." However, Jody Rosen of Rolling Stone, Melissa Maerz of Entertainment Weekly and Will Dean of The Guardian were more complementary, with Dean calling it "beautiful" and "sweet" and Rosen applauding it for being "smoky and touched with grit." Ann Powers of the Los Angeles Times said that her voice is "delicious to some and cloying to others." Duffy was compared to several female pop singers such as Kylie Minogue, Debbie Harry of Blondie and Madonna.

== Commercial performance ==
Endlessly entered the UK Albums Chart in what Billboard called a "somewhat muted entry" at number nine, selling 45,892 copies. It spent a total of fifteen weeks in the top 100, spending its last week on the chart at number seventy-five on 19 March 2011. As of October 2011, the album had sold around 200,000 copies in the UK. The album also performed well in Europe, reaching the top ten in Denmark, Sweden (number four), the Netherlands, Finland (number nine) and Switzerland (number ten), as well as on the German Digital Albums Chart. Endlessly performed best in Denmark, where it reached a peak of number two on the Danish Albums Chart, spending thirteen weeks on the top forty. The album also spent 24 weeks on the Dutch Albums Chart, but reached only a peak of number six. It has since been certified gold in Denmark, Sweden and Switzerland, by the International Federation of the Phonographic Industry (IFPI), indicating sales of 10,000, 20,000 and 15,000 respectively. In 2013, the album was certified Gold by the British Phonographic Industry.

Elsewhere, the album debuted and peaked at number twenty-seven on the Irish Albums Chart on 3 December 2010. This peak was equalled on the Australian ARIA Albums Chart, although the album performed moderately better in New Zealand, where it reached number nineteen on the RIANZ Albums Chart, spending six weeks on its top forty. In the United States, Endlessly debuted and peaked at number seventy-two on the Billboard 200, with first-week sales of 18,000 copies. The album performed better digitally, reaching number twenty-three on Billboard's Digital Albums chart.

Media outlets worldwide reported the relative commercial failure of the album. The BBC reported that it had "failed to make the top five", comparing it to the success of Rockferry as "the best-selling album in the UK in 2008." In one article, Orange, calling Duffy a "Welsh one-album wonder" said that "it must have been a kick in the teeth when Duffy's second album [...] charted at an underwhelming No. 9. Not least for her record label A&M, who have gone under after throwing large amounts of cash". The article went on to say that the commercial failure was a result of Duffy's adamance "[the album] was released before Christmas". British tabloid newspaper the Daily Mirror reported that Duffy would quit music as Endlessly "didn't sell well and charted terribly and she isn't trying again and making a comeback." The article was repeated by many news outlets and music publications worldwide. The BBC once again reported Rockferry's success as "the top international seller of 2008", noting that Endlessly had "sold very poorly".

In 2018, Wales Online reported that Endlessly had sold 306,000 copies; as of 2020, however, the BPI has not amended its certification from Gold to Platinum, the threshold for which is 300,000 sales.

== Promotion ==
Duffy performing "Well, Well, Well" at her Endlessly Album Showcase at the Café de Paris, London.

Duffy promoted the album by appearing on various television programmes worldwide throughout the latter stages of 2010 and early 2011, performing songs featured on the track listing of Endlessly, occasionally together with songs from Rockferry. A&M Records' Orla Lee noted that the campaign would focus around "major TV moments", adding "[t]he thing with Duffy is it's about the voice [...] live, you really see that." Television adverts for Endlessly were released in territories worldwide in different languages. Although an international concert tour was announced via her website, and Billboard reporting that "European and U.S. dates are expected in early 2011", this never materialised.

In the United Kingdom, the first televised performance of songs from Endlessly took place on Later Live... with Jools Holland on 19 October 2010, where Duffy performed "Well, Well, Well" and "Endlessly." She later sang "Well, Well, Well" on series eight of Strictly Come Dancing on 21 November 2010, later being interviewed and performing on breakfast show This Morning as well as light news and entertainment programmes The One Show and T4 in the same week. In December, Duffy returned to perform at Capital FM's Jingle Bell Ball, where she sang two songs from the album and "All I Want for Christmas Is You" (1994). Duffy returned to the Strictly Come Dancing finale on 20 December 2010 for a positively reviewed performance of "Mercy." International promotion began with a rendition of "Endlessly" on The Tonight Show with Jay Leno in the United States, with "Well, Well, Well" being performed later on The Ellen DeGeneres Show backed by a complete brass section on 7 December 2010, the day of Endlessly's American release. Idolator positively reviewed the performances, referring to "Well, Well, Well" in particular. Duffy also appeared on The Today Show to perform "Endlessly", and on Late Night with Jimmy Fallon on 4 November 2010 to sing "Well, Well, Well." An "intimate acoustic set" and interview was also played and conducted at the offices of Rolling Stone in America, consisting of "Well, Well, Well" and "Don't Forsake Me". Outside of the UK and the United States, Duffy's record label revealed plans for her to visit Germany, France, the Netherlands, Italy, Sweden, Denmark and Spain before the end of 2010. In Germany, Duffy performed "Well, Well, Well" on TV total Turmspringen, and Popstars and in France on Le Grand Journal. She appeared alongside Adele on the finale of The Voice of Holland on the evening of 21 January 2011, singing "Well, Well, Well". She also sang a duet of "Warwick Avenue" with finalist Ben Saunders, which was later revealed to be the winning performance of the series.

Duffy made live stage performances, known as "album showcase"s in the United States and the UK. The first of these took place at the Café de Paris in London, where fans of Duffy's could enter a competition to win tickets to the show, and members of the press were invited. The Guardian reported a six-piece band and "string sections [...] crammed on to a balcony, adding cute choreographed handclaps." Yahoo! Music said that Duffy's vocals "resonate with the warbling vibrato of someone far beyond her 26 years". Videos of seven of the songs performed at the show were later released as music videos. The first of two live shows in the United States was at The Roxy Theatre in Hollywood, where Mercury Records invited fans to enter a competition to win tickets for the event. The Hollywood Reporter said that there was a 13-piece band and that Duffy performed five songs from Endlessly, saying that "progress sounds so good." The second showcase was performed in New York City on 3 November 2010 at the P.C. Richard & Son Theater for iHeartRadio, and included a cover of "Band of Gold" (1970), alongside the songs "Well, Well, Well", "Keeping My Baby", "Don't Forsake Me", "Endlessly", "My Boy" and "Mercy." The UK performances also included the songs "Too Hurt to Dance" and "Lovestruck" in place of "Don't Forsake Me."

== Track listing ==
- All songs written and produced by Albert Hammond and Aimée Ann Duffy, except "Girl"; written by Don Paul and Paddy Chambers.
- Additional production by Stuart Price on "Keeping My Baby", "Don't Forsake Me" and "Lovestruck", with co-production on "Well, Well, Well". String production by Oliver Kraus.

No.	Title	Length
1.	"My Boy"	3:27
2.	"Too Hurt to Dance"	3:15
3.	"Keeping My Baby"	2:49
4.	"Well, Well, Well"	2:45
5.	"Don't Forsake Me"	4:01
6.	"Endlessly"	2:59
7.	"Breath Away"	4:12
8.	"Lovestruck"	2:52
9.	"Girl"	2:26
10.	"Hard for the Heart"	4:57
Total length:		33:52

Barnes & Noble Edition
No.	Title	Length
11.	"Endlessly" (Acoustic Version)	3:16
Total length:		37:08

== Personnel ==
Adapted from Endlessly's liner notes and AllMusic.

- Duffy – vocals, background vocals, producer, handclaps, songwriting
- Lachlan Bailey – photography
- Nick Banns – assistant
- Roger Beaujolais – vibraphone
- Owen Biddle – bass
- Adam Bishop – baritone saxophone
- Adam Blake – programming
- Dan Carpenter – flugelhorn, trumpet
- Jason Elliott – assistant
- Ben Epstein – bass, guitar
- Albert Hammond – acoustic guitar, background vocals, bottle, guitar, handclaps, percussion, producer
- Tyrone Henry – backing vocals, crowd noise
- Matt Johnson – bass, keyboards, organ, percussion, piano, synthesiser, synthesiser bass, tambourine
- Jon Kelly – engineer, mixing, sounds
- Oliver Kraus – arranger, producer (strings), string arrangements, strings
- Mike Moore – guitar
- Mazen Murad – mastering
- John Parricelli – guitar, electric guitar, nylon string guitar
- James Poyser – glockenspiel, harpsichord, keyboards, organ, piano, synthesiser strings, wurlitzer
- Owen Poyser – piano
- Becky Price – accordion
- Stuart Price – additional production, mixing, producer
- Questlove – drums, percussion
- Emre Ramazanoglu – drums, editing, engineer, programming, shaker
- Brendan Reilly – backing vocals, crowd noise
- Jon Smeltz – engineer
- Aaron Sokell – backing vocals, crowd noise
- Sam Swallow – keyboards
- Neal Wilkinson – drums
- Simon Willescroft – saxophones
- David Williamson – trombone

== Charts ==
=== Weekly charts ===
Chart (2010–2011)	Peak position
Australian Albums (ARIA)	27
Austrian Albums (Ö3 Austria)	17
Belgian Albums (Ultratop Flanders)	18
Belgian Albums (Ultratop Wallonia)	24
Canadian Albums (Jam!)	63
Czech Albums (ČNS IFPI)	22
Danish Albums (Hitlisten)	2
Dutch Albums (Album Top 100)	6
Finnish Albums (Suomen virallinen lista)	9
French Albums (SNEP)	18
German Albums (Offizielle Top 100)	15
Greek Albums (IFPI Greece)	10
Irish Albums (IRMA)	27
Italian Albums (FIMI)	85
New Zealand Albums (RMNZ)	19
Norwegian Albums (VG-lista)	20
Polish Albums (OLiS)	24
Russian Albums (M2)	21
Scottish Albums (Official Charts)	16
Spanish Albums (Promusicae)	40
Swedish Albums (Sverigetopplistan)	4
Swiss Albums (Schweizer Hitparade)	10
UK Albums (Official Charts)	9
US Billboard 200	72

=== Year-end charts ===
Chart (2010)	Position
Danish Albums (Hitlisten)	34
Swedish Albums (Sverigetopplistan)	61
UK Albums (OCC)	82
Chart (2011)	Position
Belgian Albums (Ultratop Flanders)	84
Belgian Albums (Ultratop Wallonia)	89
Danish Albums (Hitlisten)	100
Dutch Albums (Album Top 100)	98
Swedish Albums (Sverigetopplistan)	77

== Certifications and sales ==
Region	Certification	Certified units/sales
Denmark (IFPI Danmark)	Gold	15,000^{^}
Sweden (GLF)	Gold	20,000^{‡}
Switzerland (IFPI Switzerland)	Gold	15,000^{^}
United Kingdom (BPI)	Gold	205,000
^{^} Shipments figures based on certification alone.^{‡} Sales+streaming figures based on certification alone.
