= Live from London =

Live from London may refer to:

== Albums ==
- Live from London (Bill Anderson album), 1975
- Live from London, by Gary Moore, 2020

== EPs ==
- Live from London (Natalie Imbruglia EP), 2007
- Live from London (R.E.M. EP), 2008
- Live from London EP, by Stereophonics, 2005
- Live from London, by Duffy, 2008

== Videos ==
- Live from London (Bon Jovi video), 1995
- Live from London (Duran Duran), a 2005
- Live from London (Steve Harley & Cockney Rebel video), 1985
- Live from London 2006, by the Fantômas Melvins Big Band
- Justin Timberlake: Live from London, 2003
- Lindsey Stirling: Live from London, 2015
- PCD Live from London, by the Pussycat Dolls, 2006
- Live from London, by Jim Bob, 2005
- Live! From London, by HBO 1988

== See also ==
- iTunes Live from London (disambiguation)
