= Deluxe EP =

EP by Duffy
- Released: 3 February 2009
- Genre: Soul; pop; R&B
- Length: 26:11
- Label: Mercury
- Producer: Bernard Butler; Steve Booker; Jimmy Hogarth

Duffy chronology
Rockferry (2008)	Deluxe EP (2009)	Endlessly (2010)

Singles from Rockferry – Deluxe Edition and Deluxe EP
- 1. "Rain on Your Parade" Released: 1 December 2008 (US)

Deluxe EP, also known as Rockferry (Deluxe) – EP, is a 2009 extended play (EP) by Welsh singer Duffy, released in the United States. A custom EP containing tracks from the deluxe edition of her internationally successful debut studio album, Rockferry, it was released solely by Duffy's US label Mercury Records instead of the deluxe edition that was released in several other markets. It includes the singles "Mercy" and "Rain on Your Parade".

== Track listing ==
The track listing is almost identical to that of Rockferry: Deluxe Edition disc two, except with the addition of "Mercy" and the absence of "Oh Boy".

Deluxe EP
No.	Title	Writers	Length
1.	"Mercy (The Roots remix)"	Duffy; Steve Booker	3:50
2.	"Rain on Your Parade"	Duffy; Booker	3:27
3.	"Fool For You"	Duffy; Bernard Butler	3:45
4.	"Stop"	Duffy; Booker	4:08
5.	"Please Stay"	Burt Bacharach	3:27
6.	"Breaking My Own Heart"	Duffy; Booker	3:56
7.	"Enough Love"	Richard J. Parfitt; Owen Powell	3:16
Total length:			26:11

iTunes bonus tracks
No.	Title	Length
8.	"Rain on Your Parade music video" (Director: Sophie Muller)	3:27
Total length:		29:38

== Release history ==
Region	Date	Format
United States	3 February 2009	CD; digital download
