= ITunes Live from London =

iTunes Live from London may refer to:

- iTunes Live from London, a 2009 live EP by Little Boots
- iTunes Live from London, a 2009 live EP by Miley Cyrus
- iTunes Live from London, a 2009 live EP by Snow Patrol

== See also ==
- Live from London (disambiguation)
