= Jimmy Hogarth =

Scottish record producer (born 1974)

- Born: James Dearness Hogarth; September 1974 (age 51–52); Orkney Islands, Scotland
- Occupations: Record producer; songwriter; musician
- Instruments: Guitar; bass guitar; percussion; keyboards
- Spouse: Sarah Nixey
- Website: jimmyhogarth.com

James Dearness Hogarth (born September 1974) is a London-based producer and songwriter, whose production and writing credits include Anohni, Amy Winehouse, Sia, Tom Grennan, Paolo Nutini, Duffy, Corinne Bailey Rae, Ren Harvieu, Estelle, Tina Turner, KT Tunstall, James Blunt, James Morrison, James Bay, Maverick Sabre and Dermot Kennedy.

In 2005, he was introduced to Welsh singer Duffy and went on to contribute four tracks, including the single "Warwick Avenue" to her five million selling debut album Rockferry.

In 2008, he received a Grammy award for his work on the Suzanne Vega album, Beauty & Crime.

Hogarth is a fan of soul music such as Sam Cooke and Aretha Franklin, but admits to listening to heavy rock during his youth.

He lives and works in London with his wife, former Black Box Recorder vocalist Sarah Nixey.
