= 2008 Mojo Awards =

British music awards ceremony

The 2008 Mojo Honours List Winners were announced at a ceremony at The Brewery in London, England on 16 June 2008.

== Nominees ==
Complete list of nominees (winners in bold):

- Song of the Year
  - LCD Soundsystem - "All My Friends"
  - Nick Cave and the Bad Seeds - "Dig, Lazarus, Dig!!!"
  - The Last Shadow Puppets - "The Age of the Understatement"
  - Richard Hawley - "Tonight the Streets Are Ours"
  - **Duffy - "Mercy"**
- Best Live Act
  - Arctic Monkeys
  - Rufus Wainwright
  - Seasick Steve
  - **Led Zeppelin**
  - Neil Young
- Outstanding Contribution to Music
  - **Paul Weller**
- Icon Award
  - **Sex Pistols**
- Classic Songwriter
  - **Neil Diamond**
- Best Breakthrough Act
  - Duffy
  - Foals
  - Pete Molinari
  - **The Last Shadow Puppets**
  - Bon Iver
- Best Album Award
  - **Nick Cave and the Bad Seeds - Dig, Lazarus, Dig!!!**
  - Arctic Monkeys - Favourite Worst Nightmare
  - Radiohead - In Rainbows
  - Duffy - Rockferry
  - Robert Plant and Alison Krauss - Raising Sand
- Hero Award
  - **Motörhead**
- Hall of Fame
  - **The Specials**
- Lifetime Achievement Award
  - **Genesis**
- Special Award
  - **Judy Collins**
- Legend Award
  - **Irma Thomas**
- Classic Album Award
  - **My Bloody Valentine for Loveless**
- Inspiration Award
  - **John Fogerty**
- Roots Award
  - **Toots Hibbert**
- Les Paul Award
  - **John Martyn**
- Maverick Award
  - **Mark E. Smith**
- Vision Award
  - **Julien Temple for The Future is Unwritten**
- Compilation of the Year
  - Theme Time Radio Hour With Your Host Bob Dylan
  - The Very Best of Ethiopiques: Hypnotic Grooves from the Legendary Series
  - Cries From the Midnight Circus: The Ladbroke Grove Scene 1968 - 1971
  - From the Motion Picture Control
  - **Juno Original Soundtrack**
- Catalogue Release of the Year
  - **Pillows & Prayers**
