= Stepping Stone (Duffy song) =

Single by Duffy

from the album Rockferry
- B-side: "Frame Me"; "Big Flame"
- Released: 1 September 2008
- Recorded: 2007; Bookerland Studios
- Genre: Neo soul
- Length: 3:29
- Label: A&M (UK); Mercury (US)
- Songwriters: Duffy; Steve Booker
- Producer: Steve Booker

Duffy singles chronology
"Warwick Avenue" (2008)	"Stepping Stone" (2008)	"Rain on Your Parade" (2008)
- "Stepping Stone" Duffy's "Stepping Stone"

Music video
- "Stepping Stone" on YouTube

"Stepping Stone" is the fourth single by British singer Duffy from her debut studio album, Rockferry. The single was officially released as both a digital download and CD single on 1 September 2008 in the United Kingdom. Although it followed the massive success of previous singles "Mercy" and "Warwick Avenue", it did not perform well in worldwide music charts. However, the single received widespread acclaim.

== Writing and inspiration ==
"Stepping Stone" was written by Duffy and Steve Booker (who also co-wrote international success "Mercy"), and recorded at Booker's "Bookerland studios". It was the first song the pair completed together. According to Booker in an interview with HitQuarters, Duffy firstly wanted to do the song "completely Supremes and up-tempo" because she felt that her album still needed a "big song" to complete it. The following day she changed her mind about the song's direction and the ongoing search for a big up-tempo song would eventually lead to "Mercy".

== Release ==
It was released worldwide as the third single from Rockferry, and the fourth in the United Kingdom, Switzerland and Ireland, after "Rockferry", "Mercy" and "Warwick Avenue". The single was not released in mainland Europe, despite reaching the charts in many countries in this region. The cover art was produced by Studio Fury, and photographed by Max Dodson.

The single was released in both CD single and 7" vinyl. In a press release for the single it was stated that there would be a two-track exclusive single available for digital download, although this never came to fruition.

One press release commented about the context and content of "Stepping Stone":

"Stepping Stone is one of the many album highlights, it is a song about self-possession, strength and restraint. The music is dramatic, pulsating yet sparse, compelling the listener to focus on Duffy's remarkable vocals and evocative lyrics."
– I Like Music

== Reception ==
=== Critical ===
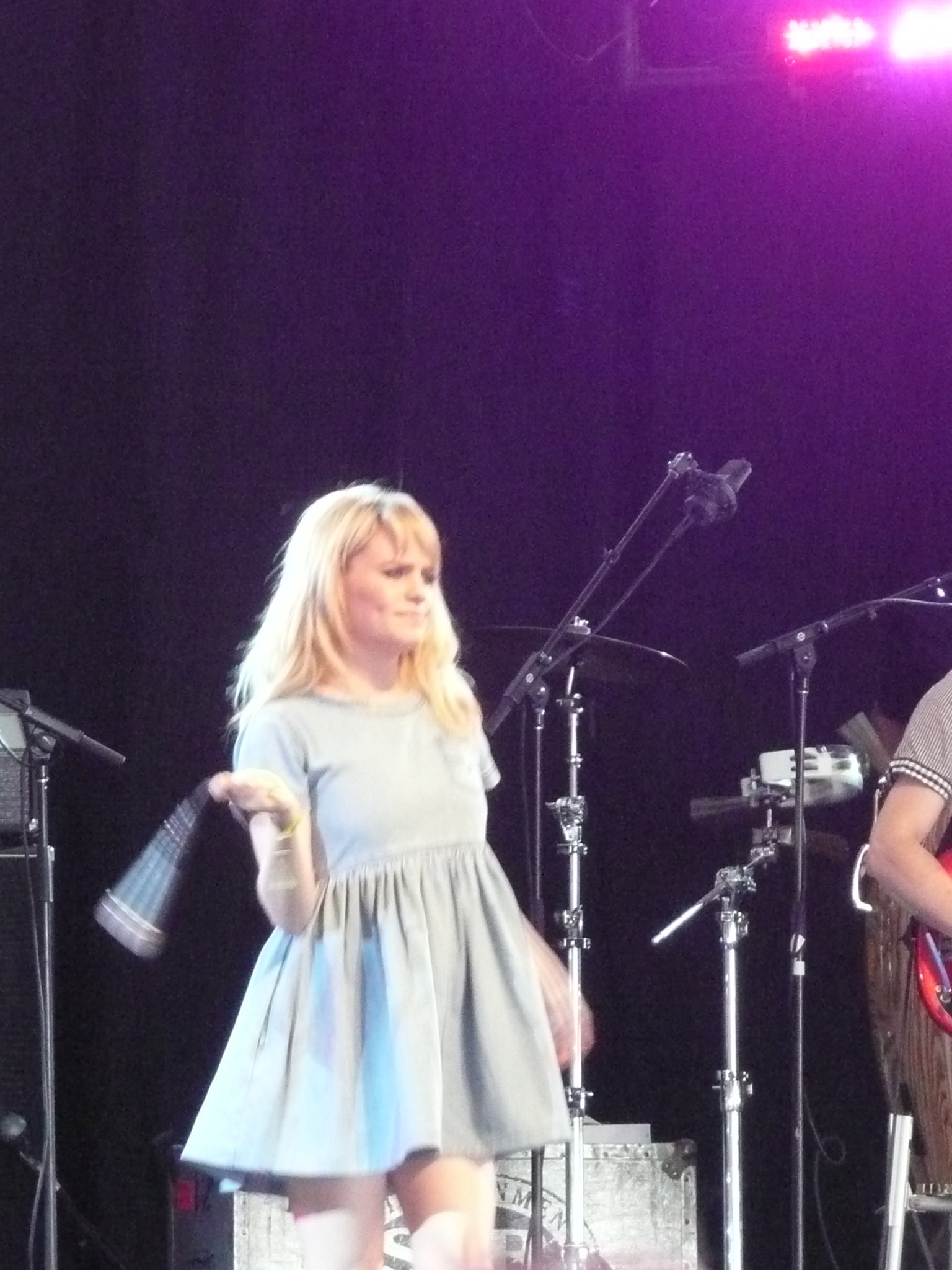
Duffy performing at the 2008 Coachella Valley Music and Arts Festival.

Clash gave the single a very successful review. In this particular review, the song was heavily praised for its "orchestral grandeur" and "slick production". Ending the review, it congratulated Duffy for being "one of the most potent pop talents in the UK". Daily Music Guide followed the positive style of Clash's review, giving the single a "4/5" rating. The writer said that Duffy "stands out" and that when compared to other soul singers such as Adele and Estelle, her "songs are better". However, the Daily Music Guide did point out that "Stepping Stone" is not as good as previous singles, when saying "'Stepping Stone' doesn't quite have the majesty of 'Warwick Avenue', the oomph of 'Mercy' or the epic sweep of the song 'Rockferry'". The review closed with the writer noting that the song is "a thoughtful and emotional piece of music". As with a Digital Spy review, Duffy and the song were compared to Burt Bacharach. Another reviewer for The Independent compared "Stepping Stone" to "elegant Bacharach style".

Following the positive trend of reviews by critics, The Hollywood Reporter said that the song "shows what all the fuss is about", referring to Duffy's success worldwide. It went on to say that Duffy "sheds so many previous vocal comparisons" with the song, also noting that the single is "clearly aimed at adults who may have shied away from the party vibe of 'Mercy'".

However, many critics gave the single mixed reviews. Digital Spy, in particular, gave the single a mixed review. Giving the song three stars out of five, the reviewer noted that "[Stepping Stone] is her weakest to date". This is against previous reviews given by the website, which were generally positive. The review went on to say that "[Duffy (with the song)] plays into the hands of critics who brand her music "coffee table soul". Finally, the reviewer said that "it [Stepping Stone] lacks the heart-melting chorus which made the former [Warwick Avenue] a triumph". A reviewer for the BBC said that "Stepping Stone" was "noticeably hanging limply" when compared to the full track listing of Rockferry.

=== Commercial and chart performance ===
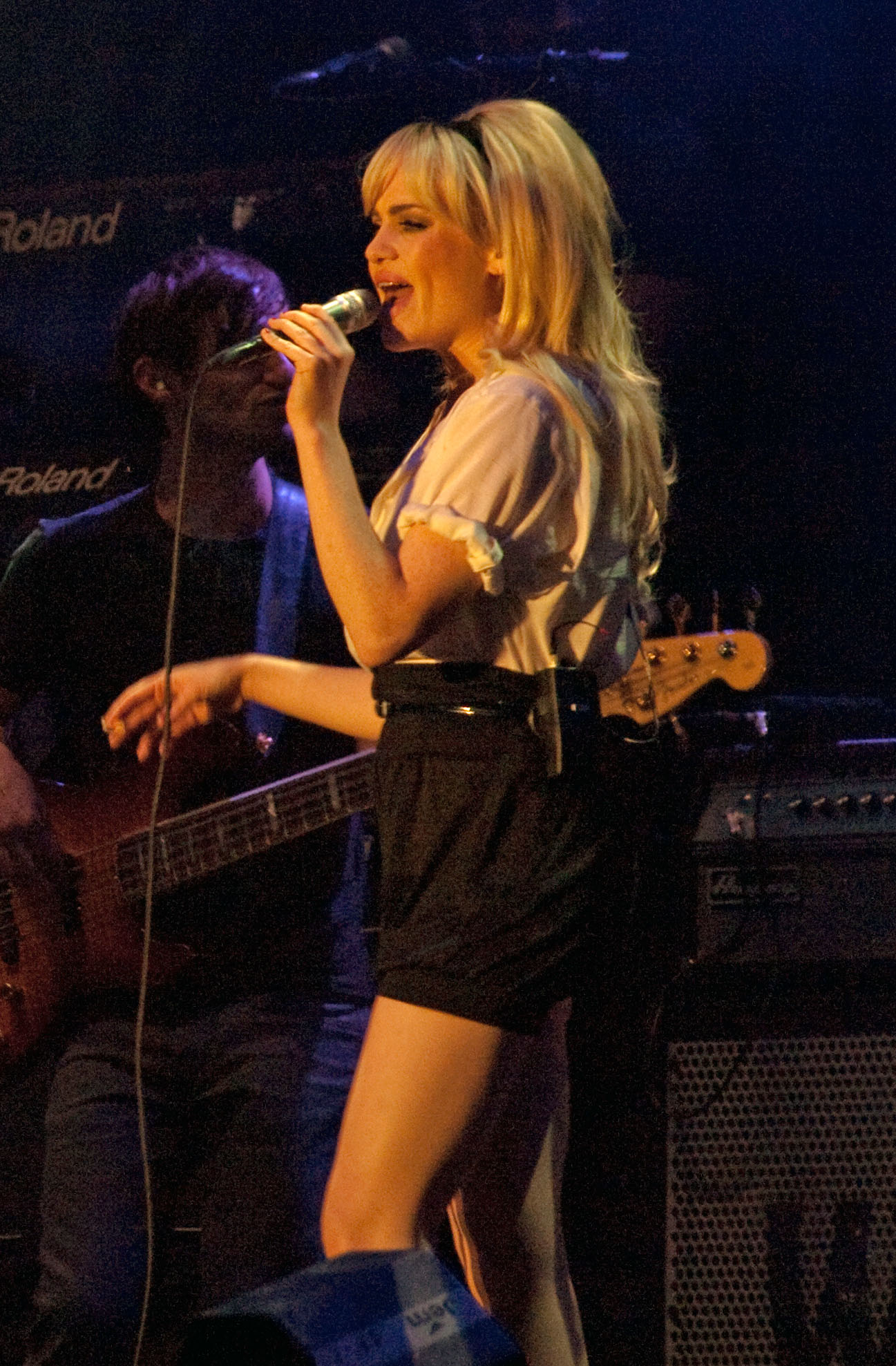
Duffy performing at the 2009 SOS 4.8 Festival in Murcia.

The song was originally one of the most popular songs on Rockferry, debuting on the UK Singles Chart at number 99, on 9 March 2008, due to strong sales from the album. This performance was behind that of the other non-single popular from the album, "Warwick Avenue", which entered the chart at number 83. However, when the song was released as a single, "Stepping Stone" re-entered the chart at number 80 and rose to a peak position of 21, reached on the chart dated 13 September 2008 . The song is Duffy's least successful single in that country, behind "Rain on Your Parade", which peaked at position 15. However, the song managed to stay in the UK Singles Chart for a total of 21 weeks. The song also featured on UK's Official Charts Company year-end chart at number 180, behind all of Duffy's previous singles and her next single "Rain on Your Parade". In Australia, despite little promotion, the song managed to chart at a peak position of 55. In Ireland, "Stepping Stone" entered and peaked in the Irish Singles Chart at number 49. In the United States, "Stepping Stone" was the third single to be released from Rockferry. The song did not manage to place on any major U.S. Billboard singles charts, instead reaching a peak of 25 on the Hot Adult Contemporary Tracks. However, on the European Hot 100, "Stepping Stone" managed to peak at number 67 on the chart.

Elsewhere, in mainland Europe, despite not being released as an official single, the song managed to chart on various singles charts in that region. In Belgium (Flanders), the song reached a peak of 27 on the Ultratop charts, whilst in Switzerland, the song reached a peak of 49 on the official Swiss Singles Chart, becoming Duffy's worst charting position there.

== Music video ==
Duffy's music video for "Stepping Stone" shows her in a mature, sophisticated style.

The music video for "Stepping Stone" depicts a mature, sophisticated style as Duffy is involved with one mysterious man. The video begins with Duffy sitting in bed, singing that she "will never be a stepping stone" to her lover. The video continues with Duffy trying on many different outfits throughout the day whilst singing the song, as if trying to impress somebody. Each time she leaves her house, she is seen going back to get changed, before finally building up the courage to leave. It ends with Duffy entering a filled bar, whilst someone enters and she looks up. The storyline suggests that Duffy is in love, however he does not love her in the same way. This fits in with the theme of the song, with its chorusline "I will never be a Stepping Stone", perhaps showing that Duffy is the bridge between two better relationships.

The music video was directed by Sophie Muller, and was first shown on video-sharing website, YouTube on 4 August 2008.

== Track listings ==
CD single
(#1780731)

1. "Stepping Stone"
2. "Frame Me" (Duffy, Bernard Butler)

7" vinyl single
(#1780732)

1. "Stepping Stone"
2. "Big Flame"(Richard J. Parfitt)

== Charts ==
=== Weekly charts ===
Chart (2008–09)	Peak position
Australian ARIA Singles Chart	75
Belgian (Flanders) Singles Chart	27
Danish Singles Chart	18
Dutch Top 40	26
European Billboard Hot 100 Singles	67
Irish Singles Chart	41
Scottish Singles Chart	9
Swiss Singles Chart	49
UK Singles Chart	21
U.S. Billboard Hot Adult Contemporary Tracks	25
Billboard Greece	3

=== Year-end charts ===
Chart (2008)	Position
UK Singles Chart	180

== Certifications ==
Region	Certification	Certified units/sales
Denmark (IFPI Danmark)	Gold	45,000^{‡}
^{‡} Sales+streaming figures based on certification alone.

== Release history ==
Region	Date	Format	Catalog
United Kingdom	1 September 2008	CD single	1780731
United Kingdom	1 September 2008	7" vinyl	1780732

== Credits ==
The following people contributed to the recording and production of "Stepping Stone":

- Aimée Duffy – writing, vocals, backing vocals
- Steve Booker – writing, production, recording, programming, mixing, guitar, bass, keyboard
- EMI Music Publishing/Universal Music Publishing – publishing

== Covers ==
The song was covered by the operatic soprano Renée Fleming on her 2010 album, Dark Hope.

Danish singer Caecilie Norby opened her 2013 album Silent Ways with Stepping Stone.
