= Aimée Duffy (EP) =

EP by Aimée Duffy
- Released: 2004
- Studio: Studio Pandy, Wales
- Genre: Celtic rock
- Length: 13:28
- Language: Welsh
- Label: Awen
- Producer: Bev Jones; Paul Eastham; Aimée Duffy

Aimée Duffy chronology
Aimée Duffy (2004)	Rockferry (2008)

Singles from Aimée Duffy
- 1. "Cariad Dwi'n Unig"

Aimée Duffy is a Welsh-language extended play (EP) by Welsh singer Aimée Duffy (now Duffy), released in 2004 on Welsh record label Awen Records. Originally to be entitled Rock, Roll & Soul, the release came after the singer had come second in a Welsh televised talent show.

== Background and release of EP ==
After finishing her GCSEs in Pembrokeshire, Duffy returned to Nefyn when she was fifteen, and started singing in various local bands. Following an unsuccessful music project in Switzerland, Duffy returned to Wales in 2003 and was invited to appear on Wawffactor, a Welsh television show similar to Pop Idol, on local station S4C. She was expected to win, but came second to winner Lisa Pedrig.

In 2004, Duffy recorded this three-song EP, which was written and produced by Paul Eastham of international Celtic rock band COAST then released by Awen Records in the same year. The release of this EP and her appearance on WawFfactor had garnered herself a popular name among the Welsh-speaking community of Wales. The EP's title is the full name of Duffy, and was also released under the name Aimée Duffy. It was after the EP's release that she decided to use the stagename Duffy professionally.

== Track listing ==
All songs written by Aimée Duffy and produced by Bev Jones, with music by Winter of Clowns.

Aimée Duffy
No.	Title	Length
1.	"Dim Dealltwriaeth" (English: No Understanding)	5:04
2.	"Hedfan Angel" (English: Fly Angel)	4:41
3.	"Cariad Dwi'n Unig" (English: Lover, I'm Lonely)	3:43
Total length:		13:28

== Personnel ==
Adapted from Awen Records and Aimée Duffy.

Music and lyrics

- Aimée Ann Duffy – lyrics, lead vocals
- Paul Eastham"coast – music
- Bev Jones – production
- Tim Woodward – mastering

Instrumentation

- Paul Eastham – piano, synths, guitar
- Mark Beal – drums
- Greg Latham – bass
- Charlie Goodall – solo guitar ("Hedfan Angel")
- Graham Land – cymbals ("Cariad Dwi'n Unig")

Graphics and design

- Ed Pari Jones – images
- Kit Wong – graphic design
- Mark Walker – graphic design assistant
- Lois Griffin – art
