= Rockferry =

Studio album by Duffy
- Released: 3 March 2008
- Recorded: 2004–2008
- Studios: Home & Maiko's; Bookerland Studios; West Heath Studios; RAK Studios
- Genres: Blue-eyed soul; pop
- Length: 37:50
- Label: A&M
- Producers: Bernard Butler; Steve Booker; Jimmy Hogarth

Duffy chronology
Aimée Duffy (2004)	Rockferry (2008)	Deluxe EP (2009)

Singles from Rockferry
- 1. "Rockferry" Released: 3 December 2007; 2. "Mercy" Released: 15 February 2008; 3. "Warwick Avenue" Released: 26 May 2008; 4. "Stepping Stone" Released: 1 September 2008; 5. "Rain on Your Parade" Released: 17 November 2008

Rockferry is the debut studio album by the Welsh singer Duffy, released on 3 March 2008 in the United Kingdom by A&M Records. It was released in the United States by Mercury Records. Taking four years to record the album, Duffy worked with several producers and writers including Bernard Butler, Steve Booker, Jimmy Hogarth, and Eg White. Primarily a soul recording musically, Rockferry is composed of ballads, torch songs, and up tempo songs in the style of 1960s pop music. It was well received by music critics, who praised the record's musical and lyrical depth and occasional darkness, Duffy's vocal performance, and the record's contemporary instrumentation and production which created a warm sound. Music critics favourably compared Duffy's work on Rockferry to the music of Dusty Springfield and Duffy's contemporary Amy Winehouse.

Rockferry was a commercial success, reaching number-one in several music markets. It was the fourth best-selling album of 2008 worldwide according to the International Federation of the Phonographic Industry and the highest of that year in the United Kingdom. The album was still in the top five of the UK Albums Chart a full year after its release, spending most of those weeks in the top ten albums, and a significant amount in the top three. In 2010, it was ranked as the 22nd best-selling album of the 2000s in the UK. The album has won a number of awards since its release, including the Grammy Award for Best Pop Vocal Album at the 51st annual ceremony (2009). Duffy also won three awards at the 2009 BRIT Awards for her work on Rockferry including Best British Album, whilst Butler was given the Producer's Award. It was also among ten albums nominated for the best British album of the previous 30 years by the Brit Awards in 2010.

A total of five singles were released from the album. The first single, "Rockferry", introduced Duffy's music to European music industries, whilst the second and lead single internationally, "Mercy", was an international hit, topping over twelve music charts and becoming the third-best-selling single of 2008 in the UK. Follow-up single "Warwick Avenue" was another successful single, whilst "Stepping Stone" did not replicate this earlier success. Rockferry was re-released as a deluxe edition on 24 November 2008, preceded by the lead single "Rain on Your Parade" which became the fifth overall single from the album.

== Background ==
In 2004, following success on Wawffactor, a Welsh language televised singing contest in which Duffy, then performing under her birth name Aimeé Duffy, the singer recorded a three-song Welsh extended play, titled Aimée Duffy, while working part-time in two jobs as waitress and in a fishmonger's. The EP later achieved chart success in Wales, charting at number one on the "Siart C2" music chart The following year, Duffy appeared on Mint Royale's See You in the Morning as a back-up singer. Duffy was introduced to Jeanette Lee of Rough Trade Records in August 2004, after singing Richard J. Parfitt's "Oh Boy"; the song was later released as a B-side to the single "Rockferry". Lee moved Duffy to Crouch End in London, orchestrating a meeting between Duffy and Suede's ex-guitar player Bernard Butler. Lee, with independent record label Rough Trade Records, would eventually manage Duffy. After Butler had given Duffy a soul music "education" by downloading tracks on to her iPod that she could listen to while around London or travelling back to Wales, the pair co-wrote with her and helped create a new retro sound. The music included tracks by Al Green, Bettye Swann, Ann Peebles, Doris Duke, Scott Walker, Phil Spector and Burt Bacharach. Duffy later told The Guardian that Bettye Swann became one of her "biggest inspirations", with Duffy being particularly influenced by her song "Cover Me" because "it marks the time I got interested in physical contact. I was 19, and here was a woman singing 'Cover me, spread your precious love all over me.' It's very tender, but it's also, hilariously, quite crude."

Duffy was contracted to A&M Records (UK) on 23 November 2007. By this time, she was finalising her debut album, to be titled Rockferry, after Rock Ferry, a suburb of Birkenhead, on the Wirral Peninsula, where her grandmother lives. She performed on the BBC Two television show Later with Jools Holland, which resulted in a second appearance on the related broadcast Hootenanny, where Duffy performed with Eddie Floyd. On 22 February 2008, she appeared on Later with Jools Holland for a third time and performed "Rockferry", "Mercy", and "Stepping Stone". Duffy also made appearances on the BBC Two television programme The Culture Show on 23 February 2008, performing "Mercy". In January 2008, Duffy came second to Adele in the annual BBC News Online poll of industry experts "Sound of... 2008", which ranks acts about to emerge in the coming year.

== Recording ==
According to Duffy, "The album took nearly four years to make. We had to hire cheap, tiny studios and sometimes there would be three-week periods between writing and recording." Bernard Butler, who was not initially paid, produced four songs for the album, including the single, "Rockferry". The singles "Mercy" and "Stepping Stone", were co-written and produced by Steve Booker, and the second single "Warwick Avenue", by Jimmy Hogarth and Eg White. "Mercy" was the last song written for the album.

== Music and lyrics ==
Duffy revealed that both "Mercy" and "Stepping Stone" are autobiographical; "Mercy" is about "sexual liberty" and "not doing something somebody else wants you to do", and "Stepping Stone" is about not expressing her feelings to a person she fell in love with. "Warwick Avenue" was the second single released from the album. The song occurred when Duffy, then 19 years old, was familiarising herself with the London Underground and accidentally found herself at the Warwick Avenue station. The following day the song "just sort of came out".

== Release and artwork ==
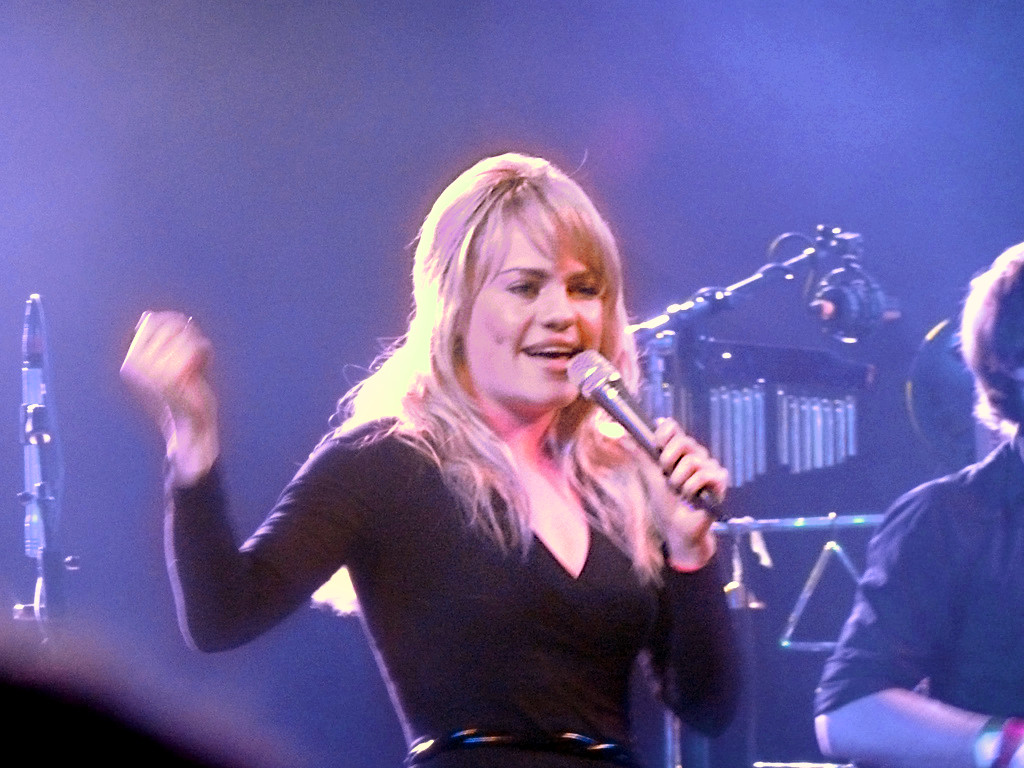
Duffy singing at SXSW, 15 March 2008

The album art and video for the title track were shot on and around the Ffestiniog Railway in Porthmadog, which was renamed 'Rockferry' for the occasion. The timing of the photoshoot was somewhat before the release of the album, when Duffy was still a relatively unknown performer.

Her first American performances took place at the SXSW conference, and the Coachella Valley Music and Arts Festival was her first festival gig. The Coachella performance delighted the crowd with 'Rockferry', 'Serious', 'Warwick Avenue' and 'Mercy'. To coincide with the release of Rockferry, Duffy performed at the Apollo Theater in New York City. Duffy received the honour of performing at the Royal Variety Performance 2008. In 2008, Duffy played many festivals in Europe. This included visits to French, Swedish and Irish summer festivals, amongst others. In the United Kingdom, Duffy visited venues such as Glastonbury and the Evolution Festival. She also toured the American summer festivals in 2008, such as a visit to Lollapalooza in Chicago.

Duffy toured the United Kingdom and Ireland during November and December 2008. To promote Rockferry, Duffy made many visits to American television, including Late Night with Conan O'Brien, and Saturday Night Live. Duffy played a fourteen-city North American tour. Plans had called for her to open for Coldplay on six of the dates. During a concert in Cleveland, Duffy accidentally set the left side of her hair on fire. In New York, Duffy was left apologising to an audience after briefly crying. She explained to the audience that this happens in one out of every 15 of her shows when she feels exposed for reasons she does not fully understand. Duffy also made a recording for British broadcaster BBC, performing at the LSO St. Luke's. The performance was televised in 2009 on the British television station BBC One.

=== Singles ===
The album's title track was released as its first single in the United Kingdom. Originally released as a limited 500 copy 7" vinyl, the song was made available for digital download on the UK iTunes Store on 19 November 2007. The song was critically acclaimed, with many noting the song was the highlight of the album.

In February 2008 the Aimée Duffy EP reached the number one spot on Siart C2. When the single "Mercy" hit the top of the charts in February 2008, Duffy became the first Welsh female to top the UK Singles Chart in 25 years, since Bonnie Tyler with "Total Eclipse of the Heart". It remained at number one for five weeks. The second single from the album, "Warwick Avenue" reached number three in the UK singles chart. The subsequent single "Stepping Stone" peaked at number 21 and the title track at number 45. The single "Rain on Your Parade" debuted at number twenty-two on 10 November and rose to a peak of number fifteen the following week.

==== B-sides ====
Year	Single	B-side(s)
2007	"Rockferry"	"Oh Boy"
2008	"Mercy"	"Tomorrow"
2008	"Mercy"	"Save It for Your Prayers"
2008	"Warwick Avenue"	"Put It in Perspective"
2008	"Warwick Avenue"	"Loving You"
2008	"Stepping Stone"	"Frame Me"
2008	"Stepping Stone"	"Big Flame"
2008	"Rain on Your Parade"	"Smoke Without Fire"

== Critical reception ==
Professional ratings
Aggregate scores
Source	Rating
Metacritic	71/100
Review scores
Source	Rating
AllMusic	4/5 stars
The A.V. Club	B+
Entertainment Weekly	A−
The Guardian	3/5 stars
musicOMH	4/5 stars
NME	4/10
The Observer	5/5 stars
Q	4/5 stars
Rolling Stone	4/5 stars
Uncut	3/5 stars

Aside from a largely unenthusiastic review by NME, the album has generally received positive reviews from critics. The Observer, for example, gave the album a 5 out of 5, describing it as "a fantastic album of burning blue soul" and drawing comparisons to Amy Winehouse and The Supremes. Review aggregator site Metacritic gave the album a score of 71 out of 100, based solely on reviews by professional critics. Entertainment Weekly gave the album an A− grade and compared the album to one of Dusty Springfield's, saying "Once the Dusty Springfield-flecked closer, 'Distant Dreamer,' comes round, you'll be wishin' and hopin' for more". In 2018, the BBC included it in their list of "the acclaimed albums that nobody listens to any more"

=== Accolades ===
The track "Serious" was included in Robert Christgau's list of Best Singles of 2008 (24th out of 25 listed songs), notwithstanding the fact that the said recording was not released as a single. At the 2008 MOJO Awards, Duffy won the "Song of the Year" award for "Mercy" and was nominated also for "Album of the Year" and "Breakthrough Act". These three nominations were the largest number of nominations for any one act. She also received a 2008 Q Award in the category of Breakthrough Act, a nomination for the Q category of Best Track for "Mercy", a Music of Black Origin Award nomination for Best UK Female. At the MTV Europe Music Awards, she received nominations in the categories of Album of the Year, Most Addictive Track, and New Act. She performed at the EMA show.

At the 51st Grammy Awards held in February 2009, Duffy won a Grammy Award in the category of Best Pop Vocal Album for Rockferry. Earlier she had been nominated for awards in the categories of Best New Artist and Best Female Pop Vocal Performance for her single "Mercy". Duffy equalled Coldplay with four 2009 Brit Awards nominations. She eventually won three awards, including Best Album for Rockferry, one behind the record held by Blur for the most won in one night. "I cannot tell you what this means after five years of hard work," Duffy said. At the awards ceremony she performed "Warwick Avenue". Record producers & songwriters Steve Booker & Bernard Butler gained awards for their work on the Rockferry album. She shared a 2009 Ivor Novello Award in the category "Most Performed Work" with Steve Booker for their work on Mercy. Songwriter Eg White won the award for "Songwriter of the Year" in part for Warwick Avenue, which he co-wrote with Duffy. "Mercy" was played on United States radio and television more than 3 million times earning Duffy a 2009 Broadcast Music Incorporated award. The album was nominated and shortlisted for the Album of 30 Years category at the 2010 Brit Awards.

Top ten lists, 2008:

- 4th – Michael Hollett, NOW Toronto
- 6th – Q
- 9th – Billboard
- 10th – Josh Tyrangiel, Time

== Commercial performance ==
"I'm Scared"
The album focuses on love themes, as seen on "I'm Scared", which sees the singer trying to deal with a break-up.

The album sold 180,000 copies in the UK alone in its first week, and spent four weeks at the top spot. The albums sales received a boost after the 2009 Brit Awards where Rockferry won the award for Best British Album and where Duffy won a further two awards. Sales of the album increased by 66% On 26 December 2008, in its 43rd week on the charts, Rockferry rose to the No. 6 position from No. 10 the previous week. In the week following Duffy's three Brit Award victories in February 2009 the album rose from No. 19 to No. 4. With a total of 1,685,000 physical and digital sales, Rockferry was the best selling album in the United Kingdom in 2008.

In the United States, the album peaked at the number 4 on the Billboard 200. The singles "Mercy" and "Warwick Avenue" peaked at number 27 and 96 respectively. By November 2008, 500,000 copies of Rockferry had been sold and had been certified Gold by the RIAA. "Mercy" has also been certified Platinum by the RIAA for sales of more than one million copies in the US. In America, the album sold 16,000 copies in its first day, and sold 72,000 in its first week, debuting at number four on the Billboard 200. Universal Music Group stated that Rockferry is the best American debut for one of its UK acts. Total U.S. sales stand at 848,000.

In France, Rockferry entered the charts at number four selling 21,862 copies. The next week, it reached number two selling 22,259 copies. Rockferry stayed at number two selling 18,187 copies the third week. So far the album sold 420,000 copies in France. Rockferry topped the Pan-European Album Chart, and "Mercy" topped the Eurochart Hot 100 Singles chart on 21 April 2008. On 12 June the album topped the European albums charts with Mercy at number 2 on the European singles chart. By 21 August Rockferry had reached number one in 11 markets. On 30 October Rockferry had been in the top 100 on Billboard's Euro Albums chart for 34 straight weeks and was residing at the number 10 position. In the first quarter of 2009 Rockferry sold 107,000 copies ranking it 13th among international artists and 73rd overall.

Rockferry was the world's fourth best-selling album in 2008. By September 2010 the album had sold 6.5 million copies, and has sold over 9 million as of May 2016.

== Track listing ==
No.	Title	Writer(s)	Producer	Length
1.	"Rockferry"	Aimée Anne Duffy; Bernard Butler	Butler	4:14
2.	"Warwick Avenue"	Duffy; Jimmy Hogarth; Eg White	Hogarth	3:46
3.	"Serious"	Duffy; Butler	Butler	4:10
4.	"Stepping Stone"	Duffy; Steve Booker	Booker	3:28
5.	"Syrup & Honey"	Duffy; Butler	Butler	3:18
6.	"Hanging on Too Long"	Duffy; Hogarth; White	Hogarth	3:56
7.	"Mercy"	Duffy; Booker	Booker	3:41
8.	"Delayed Devotion"	Duffy; Hogarth; White	Hogarth	2:57
9.	"I'm Scared"	Duffy; Hogarth	Hogarth	3:08
10.	"Distant Dreamer"	Duffy; Butler	Butler	5:05

Japan enhanced edition bonus tracks
No.	Title	Writer(s)	Producer	Length
11.	"Oh Boy"	Richard J. Parfitt	Richard Jackson	2:31
12.	"Save It for Your Prayers"	Duffy; Sacha Skarbek		3:03
13.	"Breaking My Own Heart"	Duffy; Booker	Booker	3:58
14.	"Mercy" (standard music video)
15.	"Mercy" (US music video)
16.	"Warwick Avenue" (music video)

U.S. iTunes bonus tracks
No.	Title	Writer(s)	Producer	Length
11.	"Save It for Your Prayers"	Duffy; Sacha Skarbek		3:03
12.	"Oh Boy"	Parfitt	Jackson	2:28

MTV bonus version
No.	Title	Writer(s)	Producer	Length
11.	"Mercy" (FNMTV Live performance)	Duffy; Booker	Booker
12.	"Warwick Avenue" (FNMTV Live performance)	Duffy; White	Hogarth

Deluxe edition disc two
No.	Title	Writer(s)	Producer	Length
1.	"Rain on Your Parade"	Duffy; Booker	Booker	3:29
2.	"Fool for You"	Duffy; Butler	Butler	3:47
3.	"Stop"	Duffy; Butler	Butler	4:10
4.	"Oh Boy"	Parfitt	Jackson	2:31
5.	"Please Stay"	Burt Bacharach; Bob Hilliard	Butler	3:27
6.	"Breaking My Own Heart"	Duffy; Booker	Booker	3:58
7.	"Enough Love"	Parfitt; Owen Powell	Butler	3:19

Japan enhanced deluxe edition disc two bonus tracks
No.	Title	Writer(s)	Length
8.	"Save It for Your Prayers"	Duffy; Sacha Skarbek	3:03
9.	"Mercy" (standard music video)
10.	"Warwick Avenue" (music video)
11.	"Stepping Stone" (music video)
12.	"Rain on Your Parade" (music video)

== Personnel ==
- Aimée Duffy – vocals, backing vocals, glockenspiel
- Bernard Butler – producer, guitars, piano, keyboards, drums
- Makoto Sakamoto – drums
- David McAlmont – backing vocals
- Jimmy Hogarth – acoustic guitar, electric guitar, guitar, percussion, hammond organ, bass
- Eg White – acoustic guitar, bass, drums, piano, backing vocals
- Sam Dixon – bass
- Steve Booker – guitars, bass, keyboards
- Martin Slatterly – live drums, drums, piano, Wurlitzer, rhodes piano, hammond organ
- Jim Hunt – saxophone
- Nichol Thomson – trombone
- The Wrecking Crew – strings

== Charts ==
=== Weekly charts ===
Chart (2008–2011)	Peak position
Australian Albums (ARIA)	6
Austrian Albums (Ö3 Austria)	2
Belgian Albums (Ultratop Flanders)	4
Belgian Albums (Ultratop Wallonia)	2
Canadian Albums (Billboard)	3
Czech Albums (ČNS IFPI)	2
Danish Albums (Hitlisten)	1
Dutch Albums (Album Top 100)	2
Finnish Albums (Suomen virallinen lista)	2
French Albums (SNEP)	2
German Albums (Offizielle Top 100)	3
Greek Albums (IFPI)	2
Hungarian Albums (MAHASZ)	18
Icelandic Albums (Tónlist)	17
Irish Albums (IRMA)	1
Italian Albums (FIMI)	6
New Zealand Albums (RMNZ)	1
Norwegian Albums (VG-lista)	2
Polish Albums (ZPAV)	5
Portuguese Albums (AFP)	3
Scottish Albums (Official Charts)	1
Spanish Albums (Promusicae)	2
Swedish Albums (Sverigetopplistan)	1
Swiss Albums (Schweizer Hitparade)	1
UK Albums (Official Charts)	1
US Billboard 200	4

=== Year-end charts ===
Chart (2008)	Position
Australian Albums (ARIA)	38
Austrian Albums (Ö3 Austria)	11
Belgian Albums (Ultratop Flanders)	9
Belgian Albums (Ultratop Wallonia)	12
Danish Albums (Hitlisten)	1
Dutch Albums (Album Top 100)	7
European Albums (Billboard)	2
Finnish Albums (Suomen virallinen lista)	4
French Albums (SNEP)	6
German Albums (Offizielle Top 100)	10
Greek Albums (IFPI)	27
Greek Foreign Albums (IFPI Greece)	5
Hungarian Albums (MAHASZ)	85
Hungarian Albums & Compilations (MAHASZ)	52
Irish Albums (IRMA)	10
Italian Albums (FIMI)	56
New Zealand Albums (RMNZ)	4
Spanish Albums (PROMUSICAE)	21
Swedish Albums (Sverigetopplistan)	1
Swiss Albums (Schweizer Hitparade)	5
UK Albums (OCC)	1
US Billboard 200	69
Worldwide Albums (IFPI)	4

Chart (2009)	Position
Australian Albums (ARIA)	29
Danish Albums (Hitlisten)	16
Dutch Albums (Album Top 100)	20
European Albums (Billboard)	9
French Albums (SNEP)	45
German Albums (Offizielle Top 100)	59
New Zealand Albums (RMNZ)	49
Swedish Albums (Sverigetopplistan)	77
Swiss Albums (Schweizer Hitparade)	34
UK Albums (OCC)	33
US Billboard 200	153

=== All-time charts ===
Chart	Position
Irish Female Albums (IRMA)	39

== Certifications and sales ==
Region	Certification	Certified units/sales
Australia (ARIA)	2× Platinum	140,000^{^}
Austria (IFPI Austria)	Platinum	20,000^{*}
Belgium (BRMA)	2× Platinum	60,000^{*}
Canada (Music Canada)	Gold	50,000^{^}
Denmark (IFPI Danmark)	8× Platinum	160,000^{‡}
Finland (Musiikkituottajat)	Platinum	40,743
GCC (IFPI Middle East)	Gold	3,000^{*}
Germany (BVMI)	2× Platinum	400,000^{^}
Greece (IFPI Greece)	Platinum	15,000^{^}
Ireland (IRMA)	3× Platinum	45,000^{^}
Italy Sales in 2008	—	50,000
Netherlands (NVPI)	Platinum	60,000^{^}
New Zealand (RMNZ)	3× Platinum	45,000^{^}
Norway	—	47,000
Poland (ZPAV)	Platinum	20,000^{*}
Portugal (AFP)	Gold	10,000^{^}
Russia (NFPF)	Platinum	20,000^{*}
South Korea	—	1,290
Spain (Promusicae)	Platinum	80,000^{^}
Sweden (GLF)	2× Platinum	80,000^{^}
Switzerland (IFPI Switzerland)	3× Platinum	90,000^{^}
United Kingdom (BPI)	7× Platinum	2,230,000
United States (RIAA)	Gold	500,000
Summaries
Europe (IFPI)	4× Platinum	4,000,000^{*}
^{*} Sales figures based on certification alone.^{^} Shipments figures based on certification alone.^{‡} Sales+streaming figures based on certification alone.

== Release history ==
Standard edition

Region	Date	Label
United Kingdom	3 March 2008	A&M; Polydor
Europe	11 April 2008	Universal
Australia	12 April 2008	Universal
Israel	10 April 2008	Universal
Mexico	6 May 2008	Universal
Brazil	8 May 2008	Universal
United States	13 May 2008	Mercury
Japan	24 September 2008	Universal
Turkey	24 January 2010	Universal

Deluxe edition

Region	Date	Label
Europe	21 November 2008	Universal
Australia	22 November 2008	Universal
United Kingdom	24 November 2008	A&M; Polydor
Canada	2 December 2008	Universal
Brazil	20 March 2009	Universal
Mexico	February 2009	Universal
Turkey	24 January 2010	Universal
