= Brit Awards 2009 =

British music awards ceremony

- Date: 18 February 2009
- Venue: Earls Court
- Hosted by: James Corden, Mathew Horne and Kylie Minogue

Highlights
- Most awards: Duffy (3)
- Most nominations: Coldplay and Duffy (4)

Television/radio coverage
- Network: ITV

Brit Awards 2009 was the 29th edition of the British Phonographic Industry's annual Brit Awards. The awards ceremony was held at Earls Court in London, and was broadcast live on ITV on 18 February at 8pm (GMT). Duffy became the first female artist to ever win three awards in the same year, and only Blur, in 1995, have ever won more awards at a single ceremony. The show was advertised as live by ITV but the broadcast included several audio deletions which means the show was shown on a time delay system. The 2009 Brit Awards ceremony was watched by 5.49 million people and was the 32nd most watched programme on TV on the week ending 22 February.

== Hosts ==
Kylie Minogue, Mathew Horne and James Corden hosted the 2009 edition of the Brit Awards, with Fearne Cotton presenting backstage. Fearne also hosted the launch party for ITV2 in January.

Johnny Vegas introduced and closed the event, as well as reading out the nominees in a pre-recorded voiceover. Emma B provided the live voiceovers as the artists came to the stage.

Rufus Hound, Sara Cox, Melanie Blatt and Nicole Appleton presented the Red Carpet and Encore events on ITV2.

Alesha Dixon presented a backstage programme, screened on ITV two days after the ceremony.

== Performances ==
Performer(s)	Song	UK Singles Chart reaction (week ending 28 February 2009)	UK Albums Chart reaction (week ending 28 February 2009)
U2	"Get on Your Boots"	12 (debut)	U218 Singles – 48 (+6)
Girls Aloud	"The Promise"	39 (+19)	Out of Control – 37 (+5)
Coldplay	"Viva la Vida"	27 (+18)	Viva la Vida or Death and All His Friends – 15 (+16)
Duffy	"Warwick Avenue"	71 (re-entry)	Rockferry – 4 (+15)
Take That	"Greatest Day"	52 (+10)	The Circus – 16 (+1); Beautiful World – 52 (+4); Never Forget - The Ultimate Collection – 61 (-4)
Kings of Leon	"Use Somebody"	3 (+9)	Only by the Night – 1 (+1); Because of the Times – 36 (+15); Aha Shake Heartbreak – 55 (+24)
The Ting Tings; Estelle	"Shut Up and Let Me Go" "American Boy" "That's Not My Name"	86 (re-entry); 82 (+17); 58 (+33)	We Started Nothing – 8 (+25)
Pet Shop Boys; Lady Gaga; Brandon Flowers	"Suburbia" "Love etc." "Left to My Own Devices" "Always on My Mind" "Go West" "Opportunities (Let's Make Lots of Money)” "What Have I Done to Deserve This?" "Domino Dancing" "I'm With Stupid" "Being Boring" "It's a Sin" "All Over the World" "West End Girls"	N/A	PopArt: The Hits – 19 (re-entry)

== Winners and nominees ==
British Album of the Year (presented by Tom Jones)	British Producer of the Year
Duffy – Rockferry; Coldplay – Viva la Vida or Death and All His Friends; Elbow – The Seldom Seen Kid; Radiohead – In Rainbows; The Ting Tings – We Started Nothing	Bernard Butler; Brian Eno; Steve Mac
British Single of the Year (presented by Alan Carr)	British Live Act (presented by Nick Frost)
Girls Aloud – "The Promise"; Coldplay – "Viva La Vida"; Duffy – "Mercy"; Leona Lewis – "Better in Time"; Scouting for Girls – "Heartbeat"; Alexandra Burke – "Hallelujah" eliminated on 13 February; Dizzee Rascal (featuring Calvin Harris and Chrome) – "Dance wiv Me" eliminated on 12 February; Adele – "Chasing Pavements" eliminated on 11 February; The X Factor Finalists 2008 – "Hero" eliminated on 10 February; Estelle (featuring Kanye West) – "American Boy" eliminated on 9 February	Iron Maiden; Coldplay; Elbow; Scouting for Girls; The Verve
British Male Solo Artist (presented by Jamie Oliver, Jamie Cullum and Adele)	British Female Solo Artist (presented by Simon Pegg)
Paul Weller; Ian Brown; James Morrison; The Streets; Will Young	Duffy; Adele; Beth Rowley; Estelle; M.I.A.
British Group (presented by David Hasselhoff)	British Breakthrough Act (presented by Alex James)
Elbow; Coldplay; Girls Aloud; Radiohead; Take That	Duffy; Adele; The Last Shadow Puppets; Scouting for Girls; The Ting Tings
International Male Solo Artist (presented by Gok Wan)	International Female Solo Artist (presented by Lionel Richie)
Kanye West; Beck; Jay-Z; Neil Diamond; Seasick Steve	Katy Perry; Beyoncé; Gabriella Cilmi; Pink; Santogold
International Group (presented by Natalie Imbruglia)	International Album (presented by Joe Calzaghe)
Kings of Leon; AC/DC; Fleet Foxes; The Killers; MGMT	Kings of Leon – Only by the Night; AC/DC – Black Ice; Fleet Foxes – Fleet Foxes; The Killers – Day & Age; MGMT – Oracular Spectacular
Critics' Choice Award (presented by Kylie Minogue)	Outstanding Contribution to Music (presented by Brandon Flowers)
Florence and the Machine; Little Boots; White Lies	Pet Shop Boys

== Multiple nominations and awards ==
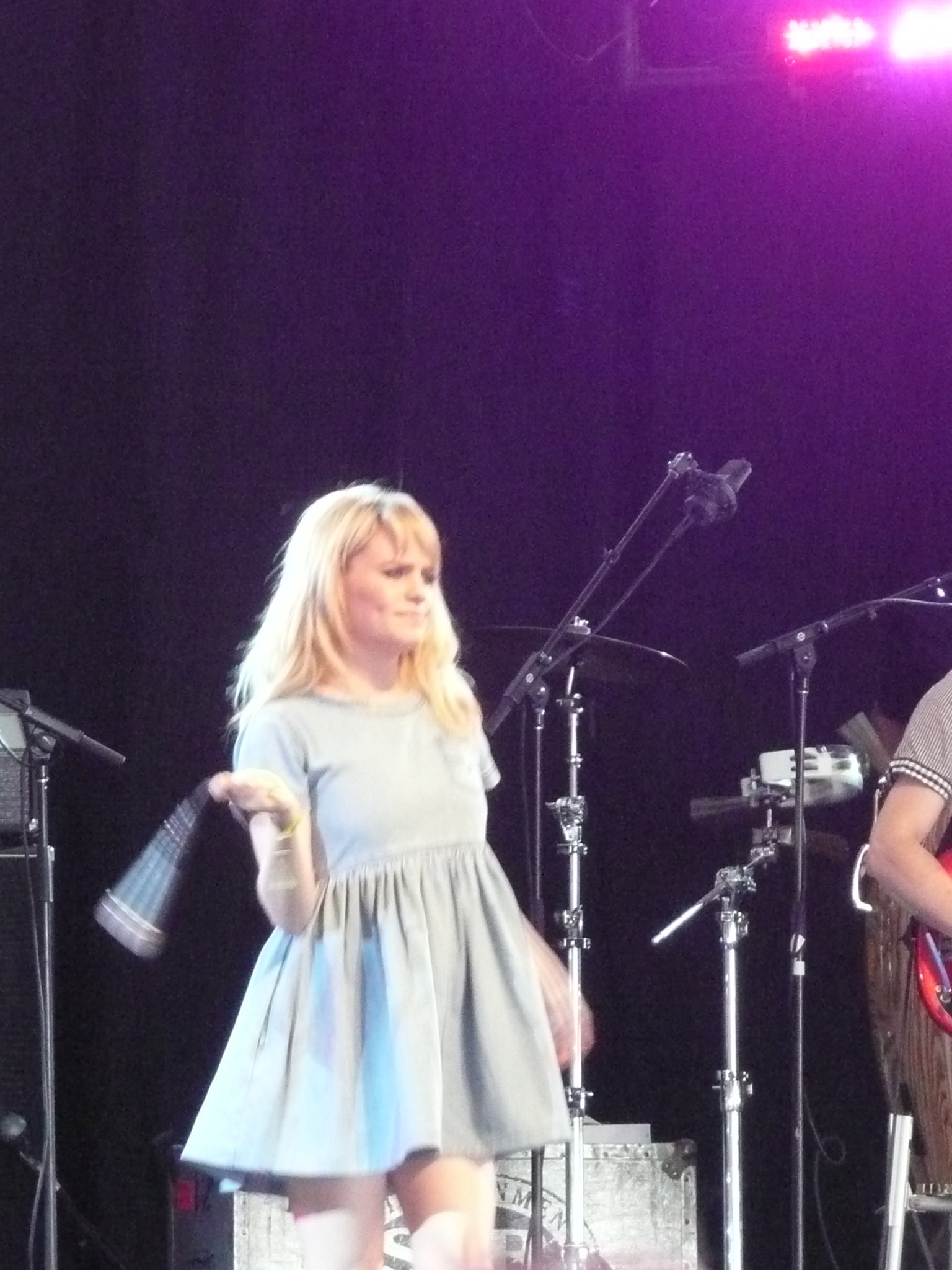
Three-time winner Duffy as most nominations and awards

Artists that received multiple nominations
Nominations	Artist
4 (2)	Coldplay
4 (2)	Duffy
3 (3)	Adele
3 (3)	Elbow
3 (3)	Scouting for Girls
2 (10)	AC/DC
2 (10)	Estelle
2 (10)	Fleet Foxes
2 (10)	Girls Aloud
2 (10)	Kanye West
2 (10)	The Killers
2 (10)	Kings of Leon
2 (10)	MGMT
2 (10)	Radiohead
2 (10)	The Ting Tings

Artists that received multiple awards
Awards	Artist
3	Duffy
2	Kings of Leon

== Memorable moments ==
=== Girls Aloud ===
British reality band, Girls Aloud, marked their first ever performance at the 2009 ceremony, by performing their single, "The Promise". The performance saw the band members, including Cheryl and Nicola Roberts appear as though they were naked, with their modesty being covered by pink feathers. This performance was nominated in the 2010 ceremony for the "BRITs Hits 30 – Best Live Performance at the BRIT Awards", alongside Oasis and The Who, which the Spice Girls eventually went on to win. "The Promise" won best British single, their first ever BRIT award.

=== Mick Kluczynski ===
Ten days before the 2009 Brits, Mick Kluczynski, the production manager for the Brits since 1995 who assisted with the transition from the Fleetwood/Fox debacle to the scale of the current ceremony, died. Despite this setback the team he put in place ensured that everything went as planned, and the show was dedicated to his memory.
