= Rockferry (song) =

Single by Duffy

from the album Rockferry
- B-side: "Oh Boy"
- Released: 19 November 2007 (UK)
- Recorded: 2004
- Length: 4:09
- Label: A&M (UK); Mercury (US)
- Songwriters: Duffy and Bernard Butler

Duffy singles chronology
"Rockferry" (2007)	"Mercy" (2008)

Music video
- "Rockferry" on YouTube

"Rockferry" is the debut single by British singer Duffy, written by Duffy and Bernard Butler. It is the first track on the album of the same name. The music video for Rockferry was filmed in Porthmadog.

== Song information ==
"Rockferry" was available for download on 19 November 2007 and was released on 3 December 2007 on limited edition 7" vinyl, with only 500 copies. A free download of the track was originally available via a link published on 15 October 2006 in Observer Music Monthly. The cover and music video was taken in a shoot at the Ffestiniog Railway in Porthmadog, which was renamed for the occasion. The B-side "Oh Boy" was written by Richard J. Parfitt. Duffy cites "Oh Boy" as the song which meant she was discovered.

The song charted at number 45 on the UK Singles Chart, as well as charting at number 35 on the Swiss Singles Chart.

== Critical reception ==
The track received widespread critical acclaim. Rolling Stone commented that she's "singing with great sincerity." AllMusic called it a "grand, sweeping ballad." MusicOMH.com said that she "carries the song unbelievably well, pouring drama and emotion into the lyrics, building up quite masterfully to the song's climax." Spin Magazine included "Rockferry" in its list of the 20 best songs of 2008. Time included it at number 9 of its Top 10 songs of 2008.

== Track listing ==
"Rockferry"

UK 7" vinyl
(175 410-6; Released: 2007)

1. "Rockferry" [Single Version] – 4:11
2. "Oh Boy" – 2:29

Promo CD

1. "Rockferry" [Single Version] – 4:09

iTunes Rockferry – single

1. "Rockferry" – 4:12
2. "Oh Boy" – 2:32

== Charts ==
"Rockferry" peaked at number 45 in the UK Singles Chart, whilst due to the popularity of the song, the B-side, "Oh Boy" managed to chart number 96.

=== "Rockferry" ===
Chart (2008)	Peak position
UK Singles Chart	45
Swiss Singles Chart	35

=== "Oh Boy" ===
Chart (2008)	Peak position
UK Singles Chart	96

== Music video ==
The black and white album art and video for the title track were shot by directors Luke Seomore and Joseph Bull, on and around the Ffestiniog Railway in Porthmadog, which was renamed 'Rockferry' for the occasion.
