= Duffy (singer) =

Welsh singer (born 1984)

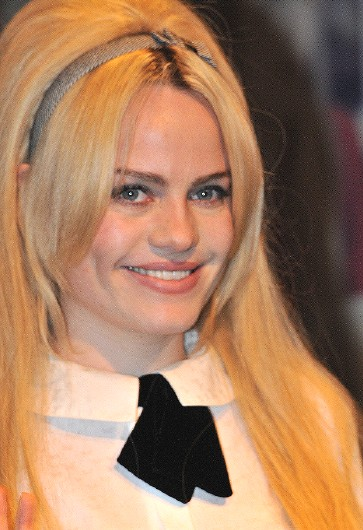
- Duffy in 2010

Background information
- Born: Aimée Anne Duffy; 23 June 1984 (age 42); Bangor, Wales
- Genres: Soul; blue-eyed soul; neo soul; pop; pop rock
- Occupations: Singer; songwriter; actress
- Instrument: Vocals
- Works: Duffy discography
- Years active: 2003–2011; 2015; since 2026
- Labels: A&M; Mercury; Island; BMG
- Website: iamduffy.com

Duffy Jones (born Aimée Anne Duffy; 23 June 1984), known mononymously as Duffy, is a Welsh singer, songwriter and actress. Her music style has been described as a mixture of soul, blue-eyed soul, pop rock, neo soul and pop music.

Duffy's 2008 debut album, Rockferry, topped the UK Albums Chart and also topped the charts in several music markets, leading to worldwide attention. It followed the lead single "Mercy", which topped the UK singles chart and also topped the chart in several countries and the top ten in twelve others. In 2009, Duffy received the Grammy Award for Best Pop Vocal Album for Rockferry, one of three nominations, and won three out of four Brit Awards nominations, for British Breakthrough, Best British Female and Best British Album. In 2010, she made her acting debut in the film Patagonia and released her second studio album Endlessly to moderate success.

Duffy vanished from the public eye in 2011, eventually self-reporting in 2020 that this had been due to experiencing abduction and rape. All musical endeavours and scheduled performances were cancelled until 2015, when she appeared in the film Legend and contributed three songs to its soundtrack; since 2015, she has again ceased performing. According to Duffy's official website, she is currently signed to Polydor Records, which operates under Universal Music Group.

== Early life and education ==
Duffy was born on 23 June 1984 in Bangor, and was brought up by her English father John Duffy and Welsh mother Joyce (née Williams) in Nefyn. Duffy's parents divorced when she was 10 and she moved to Letterston, near the Pembrokeshire town of Fishguard, with her mother and two sisters.

She attended Ysgol Nefyn (Nefyn School), Gwynedd on the Llŷn Peninsula and Sir Thomas Picton School in Haverfordwest, Pembrokeshire as a child. At the age of 17, she attended the Pwllheli campus of Coleg Meirion-Dwyfor to study for A-levels. She subsequently went to the University of Chester and studied Commercial Music Production on the Warrington campus. From 2004, she studied Performing Arts at the Parkgate campus.

In September 1998, at the age of 14, Duffy was briefly put in a police safe house when authorities uncovered a plot by her stepfather's ex-wife to pay a hitman £3,000 to kill her stepfather, Philip Smith. Smith's ex-wife, Dawn Watson, was sentenced to a 3½-year jail term for soliciting to murder. "I was so terrified. I felt so ill", Duffy recounted in 2008, as reported by the NME. Duffy describes living in the safe house as a dog-eat-dog, claustrophobic and isolating experience. Aged 15, she ran away back to her father's home in Nefyn. Duffy said in retrospect, "It was a horrendous thing to do." Her mother and her sisters did not speak to her for about a year afterwards. In reaction to her parents' break-up, her next three years were a rebellious period that included binge drinking and stealing a rowing boat.

== Career ==
=== 2003–2006: Musical beginnings ===
After finishing her GCSEs in Pembrokeshire, Duffy returned to Nefyn, to live with her father, when she was fifteen, and started singing in various local bands. Duffy then spent six weeks in Switzerland (before she started college), collaborating with the writer-producer Soren Mounir, under the name Soulego. She was advised by a lecturer at Chester University to "Go on the dole, love, and become a singer". She also built up a following at Alexander's, a local jazz and blues club in Chester, where she performed with guitarist David Burton from the band The Invisible Wires, and met songwriter Lucia Cordaro, going on to perform and record one of her songs ("I Melt"). Duffy returned to Wales in 2003 and was invited to appear on Wawffactor, a Welsh television talent show. She was expected to win but came second to winner Lisa Pedrick.

In 2004, following success on Wawffactor, Duffy recorded a three-song Welsh extended play, titled Aimée Duffy, while working part-time in two jobs as waitress and in a fishmongers. It achieved Welsh chart success in 2008, charting at number one on the "Siart C2" music chart. Duffy, now in high demand, appeared on Mint Royale's See You in the Morning as a back-up singer. Duffy was introduced to Jeanette Lee of Rough Trade Records in August 2004, after singing Richard Parfitt's "Oh Boy". Lee moved Duffy to Crouch End in London, orchestrating a meeting between Duffy and Suede's ex-guitar player Bernard Butler. Lee, with Rough Trade, would eventually manage Duffy. After Butler had given Duffy a soul music "education" by downloading tracks on to her iPod that she could listen to while around London or travelling back to Wales, the pair co-wrote with her and helped create a new retro sound. The music included tracks by Al Green, Bettye Swann, Ann Peebles, Doris Duke, Scott Walker, Phil Spector and Burt Bacharach. Duffy described Bettye Swann as one of her biggest inspirations, particularly her song "Cover Me".

=== 2007–2008: Rockferry and international breakthrough ===
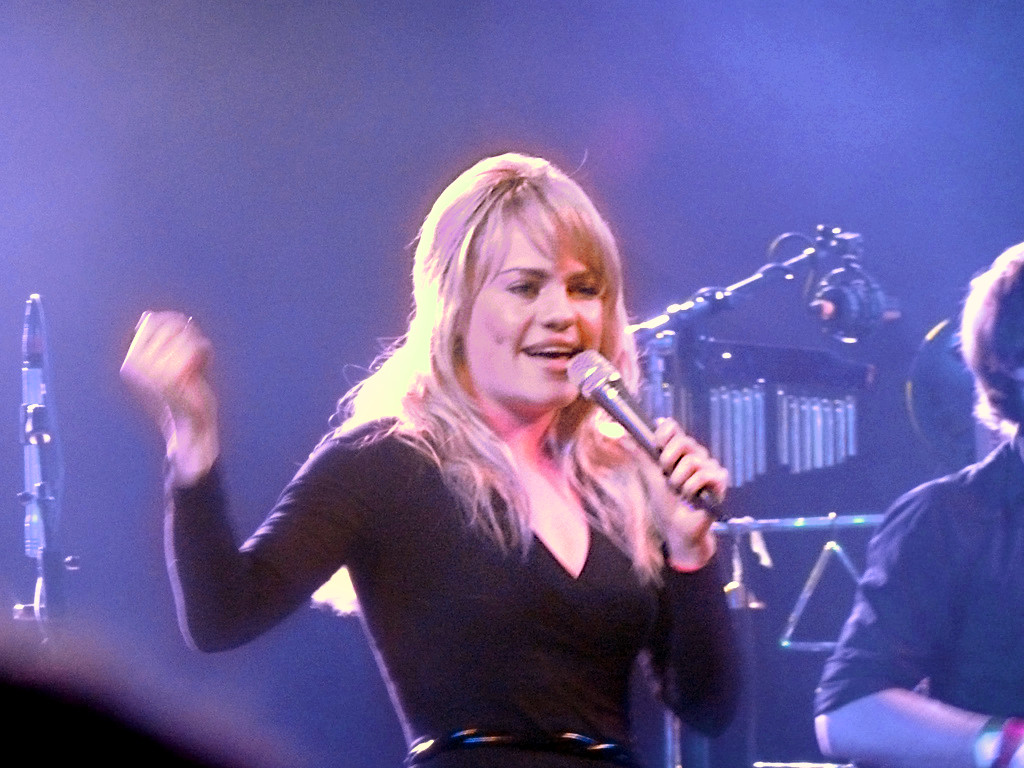
Duffy at SXSW, 15 March 2008

Duffy was contracted to A&M Records (UK) on 23 November 2007. She performed on the BBC Two television show Later with Jools Holland, which resulted in a second appearance on the related broadcast Hootenanny, where Duffy performed with Eddie Floyd. On 22 February 2008, she appeared on Later with Jools Holland for a third time and performed "Rockferry", "Mercy", and "Stepping Stone". Duffy made appearances on the BBC Two television programme The Culture Show on 23 February 2008, performing "Mercy". In January 2008, Duffy came second to Adele in the annual BBC News Online poll of industry experts Sound of 2008, for acts to emerge in the coming year. In Wales, following Duffy's recent promotion of her music, Aimée Duffy reached number-one on the "Siart C2" music chart. By 2007, Duffy was finalising her debut album effort, to be titled Rockferry, after Rock Ferry, where her grandmother lives. She subsequently struck a US label deal with Mercury Records, a newly re-activated imprint of Island Def Jam Music Group. The first single from the album, also titled "Rockferry" was critically well-received with Allmusic calling it a "grand, sweeping ballad".

Butler and his musical partner David McAlmont, along with a number of other musicians, formed the backbone of Duffy's band for her debut album, Rockferry, which was released on A&M Records on 3 March 2008. The black-and-white album art and video for the title track were shot by directors Luke Seomore and Joseph Bull, on and around the Ffestiniog Railway in Porthmadog, which was renamed 'Rockferry' for the occasion. According to Duffy, "The album took nearly four years to make. We had to hire cheap, tiny studios and sometimes there would be three-week periods between writing and recording." Bernard Butler, who was not initially paid, produced four songs for the album, including the single "Rockferry". The singles "Mercy" and "Stepping Stone" were co-written and produced by Steve Booker, and the third single "Warwick Avenue", by Jimmy Hogarth and Eg White. Duffy released the debut limited-edition single "Rockferry" in November 2007; it was followed by "Mercy", produced and co-written by Steve Booker, which went straight to number one. "Mercy" was the last song written for the album. The single was physically released on 25 February 2008. She said that both "Mercy" and "Stepping Stone" are autobiographical; "Mercy" is about "sexual liberty" and "not doing something somebody else wants you to do", and "Stepping Stone" is about not expressing her feelings to a person she fell in love with. "Warwick Avenue" was the second single released from the album. The song occurred when Duffy, then 19 years old, was familiarising herself with the London Underground and accidentally found herself at the Warwick Avenue tube station. The following day the song "just sort of came out". At first the video for the song was meant to be an elaborate production, but ended up a tearful head shot in a taxi cab with Duffy's mascara smudging. Duffy has said "That's as close as I'm ever going to get to doing a performance that's real in a video."

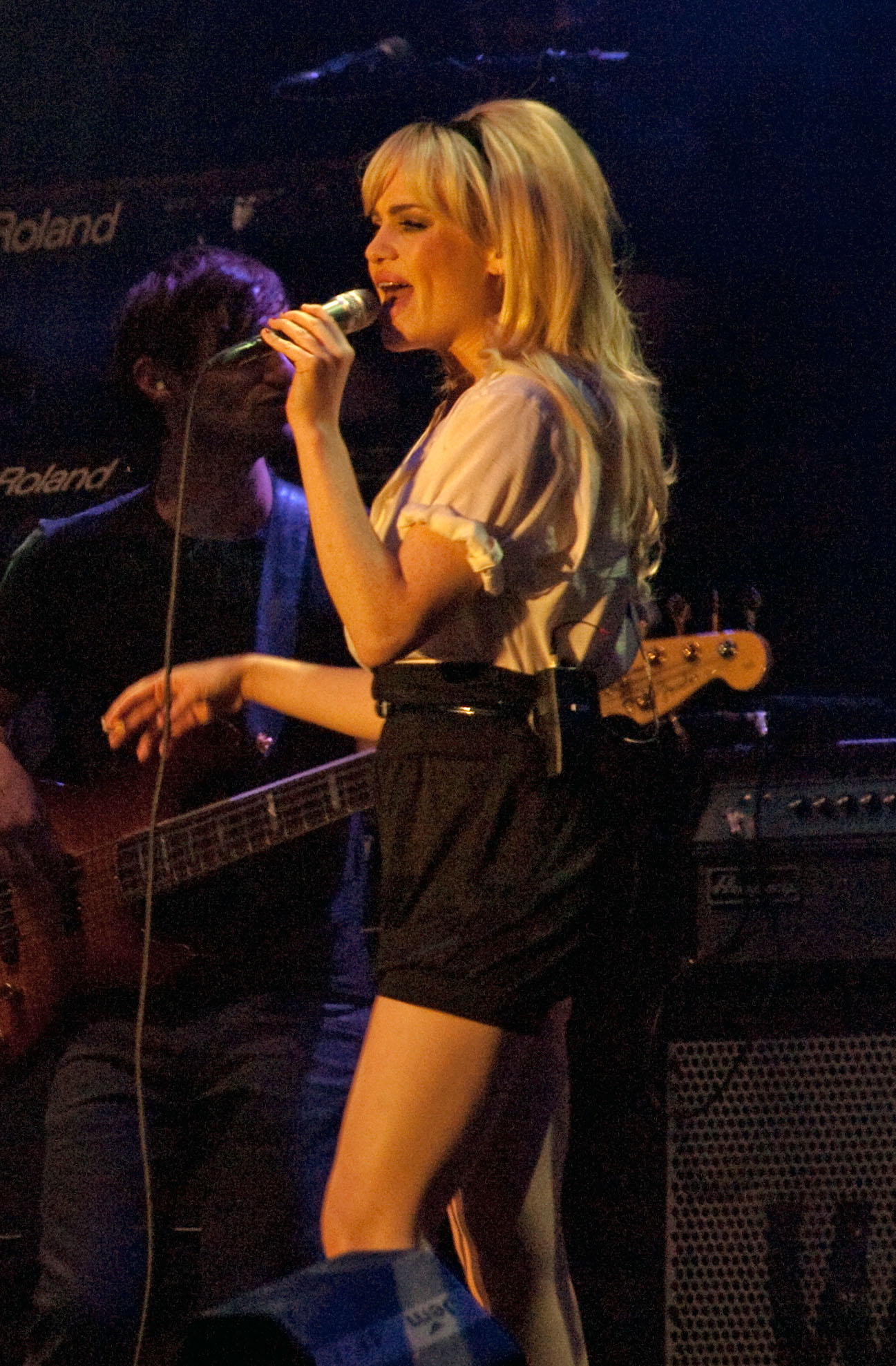
Duffy at the SOS 4.8 Festival in Murcia, 2009

By May, "Mercy" was a staple on VH1 and a hot Adult Contemporary radio hit and had been featured in the season finale of the American television medical drama Grey's Anatomy as well as being on the soundtrack album for Sex and the City: The Movie. A remix of "Mercy", featuring rap artist The Game, was released on 10 May. On 13 May, Rockferry was released in the United States to positive reviews. The album's low cost of production reaped Duffy substantial financial benefits. Despite her album's success in the United States, she was quoted as saying "I don't like how big American stars consider themselves an exception from humanity". In November 2008, the single "Rain on Your Parade", produced and co-written by Steve Booker, was released. The song was first released on download sales only on 10 November 2008, before being released physically on 17 November 2008. Duffy describes this as "a big, disco-y dance song". It entered the UK singles chart at number twenty-two before rising to a peak of fifteen the following week. The track was included on the deluxe edition of Rockferry. At the 2008 MOJO Awards, Duffy won the "Song of the Year" award for "Mercy" and was nominated also for "Album of the Year" and "Breakthrough Act". These three nominations were the largest number of nominations for any one act. She also received a 2008 Q Award in the category of Breakthrough Act, a nomination for the Q category of Best Track for "Mercy", a Music of Black Origin Award nomination for Best UK Female. At the MTV Europe Music Awards, she received nominations in the categories of Album of the Year, Most Addictive Track, and New Act. She performed at the EMA show.

Duffy has performed at concerts and festival gigs around the world. Her first American performances took place at the SXSW conference, and the Coachella Valley Music and Arts Festival was her first festival gig. To coincide with the release of Rockferry, Duffy performed at the Apollo Theater in New York City. Duffy received the honour of performing at the Royal Variety Performance 2008. In 2008, Duffy played many festivals in Europe. This included visits to French, Swedish and Irish summer festivals, amongst others. In the United Kingdom, Duffy played venues such as Glastonbury and the Evolution Festival. She also toured the American summer festivals in 2008, including a visit to Lollapalooza in Chicago. She toured the United Kingdom and Ireland during November and December 2008. To promote Rockferry, Duffy made many visits to American television, including Late Night with Conan O'Brien, and Saturday Night Live. Duffy played a fourteen-city North American tour. Plans had called for her to open for Coldplay on six of the dates. During a concert in Cleveland, Duffy accidentally set the left side of her hair on fire. In New York, Duffy was left apologising to an audience after briefly bursting into tears. She stated to the audience that this happens in one out of every 15 of her shows when she feels exposed for reasons she does not fully understand. Duffy also made a recording for British broadcaster BBC, performing at the LSO St. Luke's. The performance was televised in 2009 on the British television station BBC One.

=== 2009–2010: Continued success and Endlessly ===
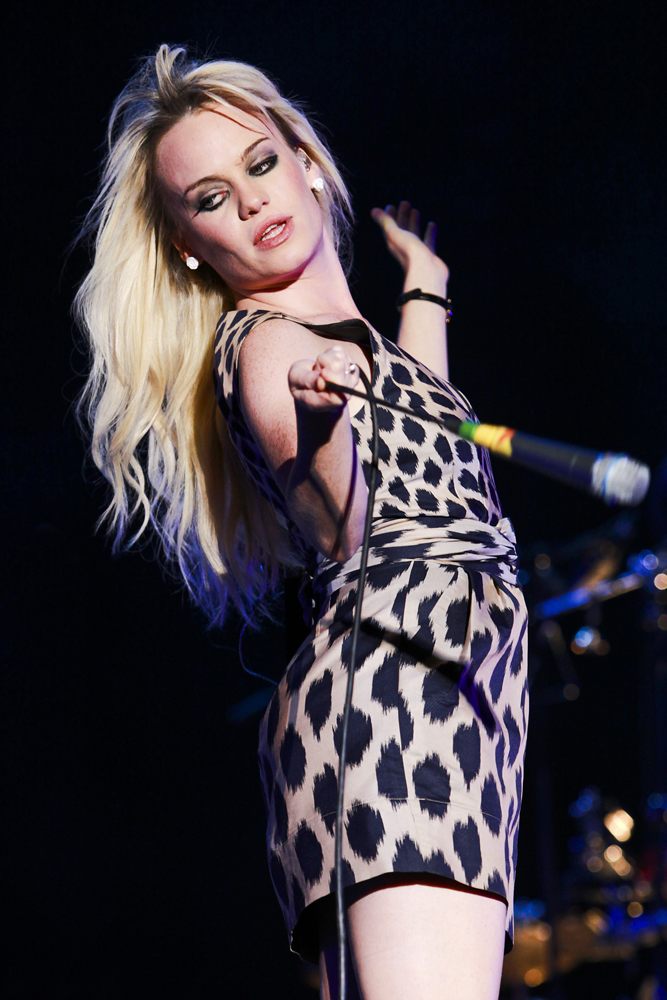
Duffy at the Super Bock Super Rock, 17 July 2009

At the 51st Grammy Awards held in February 2009, Duffy won a Grammy Award in the category of Best Pop Vocal Album for Rockferry. Earlier she had been nominated for awards in the categories of Best New Artist and Best Female Pop Vocal Performance for her single "Mercy". Duffy equalled Coldplay with four 2009 Brit Awards nominations. She eventually won three awards, including Best Album for Rockferry, one behind the record held by Blur for the most won in one night. "I cannot tell you what this means after five years of hard work," Duffy said. At the awards ceremony she performed "Warwick Avenue". Record producers and songwriters Steve Booker and Bernard Butler gained awards for their work on the Rockferry album. She shared a 2009 Ivor Novello Award in the category "Most Performed Work" with Steve Booker for their work on Mercy. Songwriter Eg White won the award for "Songwriter of the Year" in part for Warwick Avenue, which he co-wrote with Duffy. "Mercy" was played on United States radio and television more than 3 million times earning Duffy a 2009 Broadcast Music Incorporated award. The album was nominated and shortlisted for the Album of 30 Years category at the 2010 Brit Awards.

The album's success led to a period of confusion about her role in the music business that nearly led her to quit music. Duffy has said that she did not mind people illegally downloading her music because she believes most people who do are children who cannot afford the CDs and will buy them when they get older. Duffy recorded a cover of Paul McCartney and Wings' song "Live and Let Die". It was used on the War Child charity album titled War Child Heroes, Volume I. Acclaim came from Paul McCartney, who said that Duffy's version "is great –I was really impressed". Duffy and Bernard Butler wrote the song "Smoke Without Fire", which appeared on the soundtrack for the film An Education. For the 2009 movie called "The Boat That Rocked" in the UK and "Pirate Radio" in North America, Duffy sang Lorraine Ellison's "Stay With Me Baby".

Duffy said that she needed to slow the pace of her career in order to write her second album. In January 2010, Rough Trade Management, who with Jeanette Lee had managed Duffy, announced that they and the singer had parted amicably. Duffy's new management stated that "the professional relationship between Duffy and Rough Trade management has run its course." On 16 September 2010, Duffy announced the release of her second album, Endlessly. The album was recorded in New York, London and Spain in the year prior to the announcement. Duffy formed a song writing partnership with Albert Hammond for the record. Endlessly was released in the United Kingdom on 29 November 2010 and placed at number 9 in the album charts of 5 December. The album's first single failed to achieve the success of previous singles, entering the UK charts at number 41 on 21 November. Called "Well, Well, Well", the single features a rhythm section by United States hip hop group The Roots.

=== 2011–present: Planned third album, acting debut and hiatus from entertainment industry ===
In 2011, producers David Banner and Albert Hammond announced that Duffy was in the studio for her third album, but nothing happened for the next few years. In August 2011, Duffy was scheduled to perform in Monaco for the Sporting Summer Festival, but cancelled. In October 2012, Duffy was announced as a performer for the Atelier Festival in Dubai but also cancelled. In September 2013, Duffy gave her first live performance in three years during a tribute to Edith Piaf in New York City. At the 2014 Cannes Film Festival, it was announced that Duffy would star in a film project called Secret Love which was never released. In 2015, she appeared in the crime thriller film Legend, playing American singer Timi Yuro and also contributed three songs to the soundtrack, her first recordings since 2010.

After years of avoiding the media and public events, as well as not releasing new musical material, Duffy said in an interview in 2020 that she was "raped and drugged and held hostage" years ago and that was the reason for her hiatus. In 2020, she posted two of her unreleased songs, "Something Beautiful" and "River in the Sky".

On 26 March 2025, Duffy appeared in a video posted to TikTok, lip-syncing to a garage remix of "Mercy" by The Emotion; the track is expected to be released, however no date has been announced.

On 8 April 2026, Daily Mirror reported that Duffy changed her legal name from Aimée Anne Duffy to Duffy Jones. That July, she performed at her first concert in fifteen years, at London's Hoxton Hall. The event—described as intimate—only had fifty guests in attendance. Following her performance, an after party was held at London's Queen of Hoxton in Shoreditch.

== Artistry ==
On 1 February 2009, The Times Encyclopedia of modern music named Rockferry an "essential" blue-eyed soul recording. Albums by Amy Winehouse and Adele were also named as essential blue-eyed soul recordings in the "recent" category. During her Best New Artist acceptance speech at the 51st Annual Grammy Awards, Adele said that she loved Duffy and thought she was "amazing".

Duffy lists Marvin Gaye, Phil Spector, and Arcade Fire as her musical influences.

== Other projects ==
Duffy has endorsed several products. In August 2008, she appeared in Fashion Rocks, supporting a new range of Nivea products. Duffy has also appeared in various European television commercials endorsing the beverage Diet Coke. The campaign, showing her cycling through a supermarket singing "I Gotta Be Me", was launched on British television station ITV, following the 2009 BRIT Awards, which saw Duffy take home three awards for her work. Duffy was named as the "face" of the brand, alongside other famous women, though her initial advert for the brand was widely deemed as a career misstep. In addition, the advert went on to spark unexpected complaints about the health of children when it showed Duffy riding without protective gear, to the United Kingdom's Advertising Standards Authority. However, these claims were ultimately rejected.

Duffy made her film debut playing the character of Sissy in the 2010 drama film Patagonia, directed by Marc Evans. Sissy's character is "a Welsh student who livens up the holiday of a young Argentinian man on a trip to Wales". The film is about Welsh Argentines living in Y Wladfa, Patagonia, Argentina. Patagonia premiered at the Seattle International Film Festival on 10 June 2010, and was released in October 2010.

== Personal life ==
Duffy dated Cheshire-born Mark Durston for over five years until November 2006. They lived in Abersoch. In September 2008, Duffy said that she was "on the borderline of a nervous breakdown" because of the pressure that fame had brought her. She said that she had considered becoming a recluse, but eventually decided against the idea for the sake of her fans. Although acknowledging that most people do mean well, she spoke of finding it "scary" when people recognised her in the street, and was fearful of her image possibly changing the person she is. In 2009, Duffy's estimated fortune of £4 million placed her in 16th place in that year's Sunday Times listing of Great Britain's wealthiest young musicians. She dated Welsh international rugby player Mike Phillips from September 2009 to May 2011.

On 3 October 2012, Duffy escaped from a fire in her rented penthouse apartment in Abbots House in Kensington, London.

She was awarded an Honorary Fellowship by Bangor University on 10 July 2011.

In July 2011, Duffy was sued by Angela Becker, the manager she had hired in 2010 to replace her former manager Jeanette Lee. Becker said that she was hired in March 2010 and was dismissed in December 2010, but was supposed to remain Duffy's manager until the end of the promotion of Endlessly or alternatively four months after its initial release.

=== Kidnapping and recovery ===
On 25 February 2020, on her official website, Duffy wrote that she had been "raped and drugged and held hostage over some weeks". She said she had disappeared from the spotlight so she could recover, adding that she was now doing well, but it had taken her time to recover. She did not disclose the identity of her attackers, or when or where the attack took place.

In a longer statement published that April, Duffy wrote that she had been drugged at a restaurant on her birthday, taken to a foreign country on a plane, and then held captive in a hotel room and raped. Since the ordeal, Duffy says that she has spent "almost 10 years completely alone" and, thanking her psychologist, said that she now felt she could "leave this decade behind", but added: "I very much doubt I will ever be the person people once knew".

In an upcoming documentary on Disney+, Duffy will discuss the sexual assault and her retreat from public life in detail for the first time.

== Discography ==
Studio albums

- Rockferry (2008)
- Endlessly (2010)

== Filmography ==
=== Film ===
Year	Title	Role
2010	Patagonia	Sissy
2015	Legend	Timi Yuro

== See also ==
- List of kidnappings
