= Warwick Avenue (song) =

Single by Duffy

from the album Rockferry
- B-side: "Put It in Perspective"; "Loving You"
- Released: 26 May 2008
- Recorded: 2007
- Genre: Soul
- Length: 3:46
- Label: A&M (UK); Mercury (US)
- Songwriters: Aimée Ann Duffy; Jimmy Hogarth; Eg White
- Producer: Jimmy Hogarth

Duffy singles chronology
| "Mercy" (2008) | "Warwick Avenue" (2008) | "Stepping Stone" (2008) |

Music video
- "Warwick Avenue" on YouTube

"Warwick Avenue" is a song by British singer Duffy from her debut album Rockferry (2008). The title refers to Warwick Avenue tube station in London. It was written by Jimmy Hogarth, Eg White, and Duffy and produced by Hogarth. It was released in May 2008 as the third single (second in North America) from the album, but had already charted by March and April due to download sales. It peaked at number three on the UK Singles Chart due to strong download and physical sales and has sold 249,165 copies in the UK to date. The B-side to the 7" single is "Loving You", and was written by Duffy, Richard J. Parfitt of the 60ft Dolls and Owen Powell of Catatonia.

This song was number forty-one on Rolling Stone's list of the 100 Best Songs of 2008.

== Single promotion, performances and cultural use ==
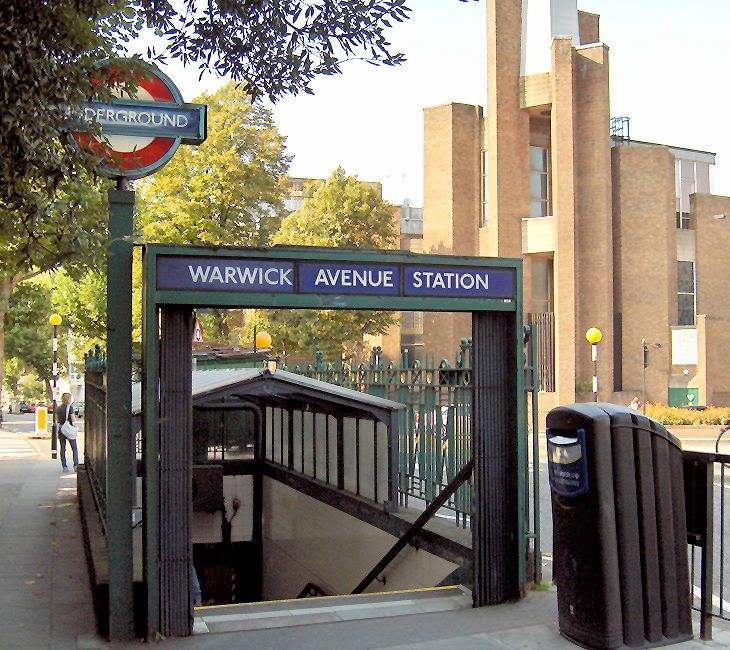
Warwick Avenue Tube Station

The song has been used as background music to several TV soap operas. It was used at the end of an episode of Hollyoaks which aired on 10 October 2008, and was used in the 11 March 2009 episode of Waterloo Road. It also appears in the Activision game Band Hero and was performed by Jenny Douglas on Over the Rainbow.

Duffy performed the song at the 2009 Brit Awards, where she won the awards for Breakthrough Artist, MasterCard British Album, and Best British Female, the most awards for a female artist in one night.

== Music details ==
The song is played in the key of Bb Major at a tempo of 84bpm. The vocal range is G3-D5.

== Critical reception ==
"Warwick Avenue"

The song received mostly positive reviews from critics. Digital Spy called it "cooler than a polar bear's freezer," "probably the finest cut from her debut LP," and "a classy affair," whilst also awarding the song four stars out of five.

=== Awards and recognition ===
| Year | Award | Category | Result |
|---|---|---|---|
| 2008 | 2008 MTV Video Music Awards | Best UK Music Video | Nominated |
| 2008 | Rolling Stone | Best Songs of 2008 | 41st |

== Chart performance ==
"Warwick Avenue" entered the UK Singles Chart at number eighty-three, more than two months before its release (because of digital downloads from Duffy's Rockferry release). It then began a gradual chart climb, before peaking at number three, and spending six weeks in the top ten. During its first chart run it managed to spend a very successful number thirty-two weeks on the chart, last seen at number ninety-eight. Due to her ongoing success and the popularity of the song, "Warwick Avenue" re-entered the UK Singles Chart at number seventy-five, before rising to number seventy-four and falling to number eighty-seven the following week. This brought its total chart run in the United Kingdom to 35 weeks. On 28 December 2008, the UK Singles Chart landed this at number thirty-one for the year-end chart.

== Music video ==
The music video for "Warwick Avenue" premiered on 23 April 2008, on Channel 4 and was directed by Daniel Wolfe. The video is almost entirely composed of a single shot; it starts with Duffy leaving Warwick Avenue tube station in the back of a black taxi, crying as she is singing the song. The video finishes with Duffy still in the car, wiping her tears, which had ruined her make-up. The taxi scene was only meant to be one scene from the whole video but the director felt that it was best to use this scene only when Duffy cried real tears. He continued to film it as the whole music video.

The video was later nominated for a MTV Video Music Award in 2008 in the Best UK Video category, but lost to "Shut Up and Let Me Go" by the Ting Tings.

== Formats and track listings ==
UK CD single

1. "Warwick Avenue"
2. "Put It in Perspective"

UK 7" vinyl single

1. "Warwick Avenue"
2. "Loving You"(Richard J. Parfitt, Owen Powell)

Australian digital download single

1. "Warwick Avenue"
2. "Put It in Perspective"
3. "Loving You"

German maxi single

1. "Warwick Avenue"
2. "Put It in Perspective"
3. "Loving You"
4. "Warwick Avenue Video"

iTunes B-side single

1. "Put It in Perspective"
2. "Loving You"

== Charts ==
=== Weekly charts ===
| Chart (2008) | Peak position |
|---|---|
| Austria (Ö3 Austria Top 40) | 17 |
| Belgium (Ultratop 50 Flanders) | 14 |
| Belgium (Ultratop 50 Wallonia) | 25 |
| Czech Republic Airplay (ČNS IFPI) | 14 |
| Denmark (Tracklisten) | 7 |
| Europe (Eurochart Hot 100) | 11 |
| Euro Digital Songs (Billboard) | 7 |
| Finland (Suomen virallinen lista) | 19 |
| France (SNEP) | 14 |
| Germany (GfK) | 12 |
| Germany Airplay (BVMI) | 5 |
| Hungary (Editors' Choice Top 40) | 31 |
| Ireland (IRMA) | 11 |
| Italy (FIMI) | 21 |
| Netherlands (Dutch Top 40) | 19 |
| Netherlands (Single Top 100) | 9 |
| New Zealand (Recorded Music NZ) | 15 |
| Norway (VG-lista) | 15 |
| Romania (Romanian Top 100) | 82 |
| Scotland Singles (Official Charts) | 7 |
| Sweden (Sverigetopplistan) | 16 |
| Switzerland (Schweizer Hitparade) | 12 |
| UK Singles (Official Charts) | 3 |

=== Year-end charts ===
| Chart (2008) | Position |
|---|---|
| Belgium (Ultratop 50 Flanders) | 63 |
| Croatia International Airplay (HRT) | 2 |
| Europe (Eurochart Hot 100) | 35 |
| France (SNEP) | 97 |
| Germany (Media Control GfK) | 70 |
| Netherlands (Dutch Top 40) | 94 |
| Netherlands (Single Top 100) | 24 |
| Sweden (Sverigetopplistan) | 63 |
| Switzerland (Schweizer Hitparade) | 55 |
| UK Singles (OCC) | 30 |

== Certifications ==
| Region | Certification | Certified units/sales |
|---|---|---|
| Denmark (IFPI Danmark) | 2× Platinum | 180,000^{‡} |
| Germany (BVMI) | Gold | 150,000^{‡} |
| New Zealand (RMNZ) | Platinum | 30,000^{‡} |
| United Kingdom (BPI) | Platinum | 600,000^{‡} |
^{‡} Sales+streaming figures based on certification alone.

== Release history ==
| Region | Date |
|---|---|
| United Kingdom | 26 May 2008 |
| Europe | 4 July 2008 |
| United States | 5 August 2008 |
| Australia | 1 September 2008 (digital) |
| France | 12 September 2008 |
