= Rain on Your Parade =

Single by Duffy

from the album Rockferry (Deluxe edition)
- B-side: "Smoke Without Fire"; "Big Flame"; "Syrup & Honey"
- Released: 9 November 2008
- Recorded: 2008; Bookerland Studios
- Genre: Pop
- Length: 3:29
- Label: A&M
- Songwriters: Aimée Duffy; Steve Booker
- Producer: Steve Booker

Duffy singles chronology
"Stepping Stone" (2008)	"Rain on Your Parade" (2008)	"Well, Well, Well" (2010)

Music video
- "Rain on Your Parade" on YouTube

"Rain on Your Parade" is a song by British singer Duffy from the deluxe version of her debut studio album Rockferry (2008). It was released as the lead and only single from the deluxe album worldwide on 9 November 2008. The song was written by Duffy and Rockferry collaborator Steve Booker and produced by Booker. It is an up-tempo pop song in which Duffy uses an idiom for ruining her lover and their intentions. The song marked a departure from the down-tempo soul and balladry of the original version of Rockferry, incorporating elements of R&B and soul. It received positive reviews from critics, with many complimenting Duffy's vocals. Musically, the song bears a striking resemblance to James Bond songs, making notable use of strings. It was called a "big, retro-sounding pop-soul number".

Commercially, the song was a moderate chart success, peaking at number 15 on the UK Singles Chart, and reaching the top ten on the Italian FIMI Singles Chart. The song's accompanying music video featured Duffy in a style never previously connected with her, with a complicated dance routine and violin players. Duffy performed "Rain on Your Parade" on several television shows including The Royal Variety Show and New Year Live, whilst it has since featured on several film soundtracks and compilation albums. The song was released alongside three B-sides, one of which, titled "Smoke Without Fire" was written for the film An Education.

== Live performances and usage in media ==
Duffy performed "Rain on Your Parade" on various TV shows and broadcast festivals in order to promote the release. Shows included The Royal Variety Show, New Year Live and various others. It was one of two Duffy songs, along with "I'm Scared", that featured in the film Bride Wars (2009). She also performed the track on the BBC's Comic Relief charity appeal. The song features a prevalent string section that plays the main riff on the track.

"Rain on Your Parade" was also used to promote season 5 of Desperate Housewives in Australia.

== Reception ==
=== Critical ===
The song was well received by critics, with one picking up on the "James Bond" feel to the track. Digital Spy gave the single four out of five stars and predicted that it would be another "smash" for Duffy with its "distinctive" vocals.

=== Chart performance ===
On the UK Singles Chart, it debuted at number 22 on digital download sales, before rising to number fifteen, giving Duffy her third top twenty hit, and then falling to number 22 again. After leaving the top forty the song re-entered the chart, at number thirty seven then went up 5 places to number 32, where it stayed for two weeks. The following week, it left the top forty again. It remains Duffy's final top 40 hit to date.

Duffy in the music video for the song wearing black clothes, while men in the dark are dancing to the rhythm of the song.

The song was also Duffy's second top ten hit on the Italian Singles Chart where it entered the chart at number ten giving Rain on Your Parade its first top ten chart placing in Europe. The song was also Duffy's fourth top forty hit on many European single charts.

== Music video ==
The music video was shot in London, with director Sophie Muller and premiered via YouTube on 17 October 2008. The video has Duffy in a black background which changes to white, it also has people playing violins, and has male dancers around her whilst she stands in the centre of the room. Inspiration for the video came from the Judy Garland number "Get Happy" in the 1950 film Summer Stock. The video was released onto UK iTunes on 14 October.

== Track listing ==
CD single

1. "Rain on Your Parade"
2. "Syrup & Honey" (Duffy, Bernard Butler)

7" vinyl

1. "Rain on Your Parade"
2. "Smoke Without Fire" (Duffy, Butler)

European enhanced maxi-single

1. "Rain on Your Parade"
2. "Syrup & Honey"
3. "Smoke Without Fire"
4. "Big Flame" (Richard J. Parfitt)
5. "Rain on Your Parade" (music video)

European CD single

1. "Rain on Your Parade"
2. "Smoke Without Fire"

Digital download

1. "Rain on Your Parade"

Australian digital download

1. "Rain on Your Parade"
2. "Syrup & Honey"
3. "Smoke Without Fire"
4. "Big Flame" (Richard J. Parfitt)

Music video download

1. "Rain on Your Parade" (music video)

== Release history ==
Region	Date	Format
United Kingdom	9 November 2008	Digital download
United Kingdom	17 November 2008	CD single; 7"
United States	1 December 2008	Digital download; CD
Germany	5 December 2008	Digital download; CD

== Charts ==
=== Weekly charts ===
Chart (2008–2009)	Peak position
Australian ARIA Singles Chart	55
Austria (Ö3 Austria Top 40)	49
Belgium (Ultratop 50 Flanders)	27
Czech Republic (IFPI)	26
Euro Digital Songs (Billboard)	19
Germany (GfK Entertainment)	29
Ireland (IRMA)	50
Italy (FIMI)	10
Netherlands (Dutch Top 40)	31
Norway (VG-lista)	17
Sweden (Sverigetopplistan)	32
Switzerland (Schweizer Hitparade)	25
UK Singles (Official Charts)	15

=== Year-end charts ===
Chart (2008)	Position
UK Singles (OCC)	151
