= Jeannette Lee =

British music record executive, music manager, filmmaker and former musician

- Origin: United Kingdom
- Genres: Post-punk
- Occupations: Record company executive; music management; filmmaker; former musician
- Years active: 1975–present

Jeannette Lee is a British music record executive, music manager, filmmaker and former musician. A retail worker at the Acme Attractions store that, along with the SEX boutique run by Malcolm McLaren and Vivienne Westwood, was instrumental in spawning punk in the UK, she went on to become a member of post-punk band Public Image Ltd (PiL). Lee is currently co-owner of the independent record label Rough Trade Records.

== History ==
Lee grew up in the 1970s in a council estate in London. To stay out of trouble she spent most of her time in her room listening to records. While she was at a club she was noticed by Don Letts, who asked her to work for a store he was managing, Acme Attractions. It was here she met and befriended key players in London's up-and-coming punk scene, including the Sex Pistols.

After the Pistols' disintegration, frontman John Lydon asked her to help out with his new band, Public Image Ltd. She first took a management role but later became a public face in the band as a singer/performer on stage. In 1981, her face appeared on the front sleeve of The Flowers of Romance. Lee and PiL moved to New York City, where they stayed during 1981 and 1982. There, Lee brought a multimedia awareness to the band, including using video as an aspect of live performances. This would lead to the 'riot' at the Ritz when the band elected to play behind a giant video screen.

Lee moved back to London and married Gareth Sager. While raising their first child, she was approached by Geoff Travis with an offer to join him in managing the Rough Trade label. Eventually, in 1987, the two became full partners.

Rough Trade had many successes, signing acts such as Stiff Little Fingers, The Smiths and The Sundays before going bankrupt in 1991 due to cash flow problems within their distribution business and an expensive and unsuccessful new computer system. Lee and Travis then moved into band management for successful groups including The Cranberries and Pulp.

In 2000, Sanctuary Records decided to resurrect Rough Trade and brought on Lee and Travis to run their old label again. The label had immediate success with The Strokes, Arcade Fire and The Libertines. Musicians have credited Lee's musical sense and straightforward honesty as important components of the label's ability to keep signing the next big band. In July 2007 Sanctuary Records then sold Rough Trade to the Beggars Group making it once again independent.

Lee personally managed Welsh soul singer Duffy, from 2006 until the relationship ended in January 2010.
