= Dawn Shadforth =

English director

- Born: 11 October 1973 (age 52); Billericay, England, UK
- Occupations: Film director, music video director, visual artist
- Years active: 1992–present

Dawn Shadforth (born 11 October 1973) is a British director of music videos, TV, and film and a visual artist. She was originally a fine artist making work with objects, light, video and sound.

== Early life ==
Shadforth was born on 11 October 1973 in Billericay, Essex, England the daughter of a pharmacist Richard and ceramicist Sue. She graduated from Sheffield Hallam University with a degree in sculpture, and in 2018 was with an honorary doctorate from the same institution.

== Career ==
=== Early work ===
In 1995, Shadforth directed The Friends Tale, a 10-minute experimental docudrama for Channel 4's Battered Britain series. Around the same time she directed The Seven Year Glitch, an experimental film documenting the Warp Records seven-year anniversary tour, screened at onedotzero in London, United Kingdom and Sónar in Barcelona, Spain.

=== Music videos ===
In 1996, Shadforth directed a music video for the track "Hush" by Kurtis Mantronik. The video was filmed in Brooklyn in New York City and Sheffield. It features cameos by Todd Terry, Róisín Murphy, Jason Buckle from the band Relaxed Muscle and DJ Winston Hazel amongst others. In 1997, Shadforth's music video for Sheffield band All Seeing I's single "Beat Goes On" won for Best Dance Video at the 1998 Muzik Video Awards and for Best New Director and Best Editing at the 1999 CAD Awards.

In 1999, she directed a video for Garbage’s "Special" featuring the band dog fighting in futuristic aircraft in the skies above a barren desert planet. The video was awarded Visionary Video at the VH1/Vogue Fashion Awards.

In 2000, she first worked with Kylie Minogue on the music video to her hit "Spinning Around", where she insisted the star wear gold hotpants that eventually became a trademark. 2001, Shadforth made the Kylie Minogue video "Can't Get You Out of My Head". In 2005 she directed the award-winning promo film for "The Importance of Being Idle", the acclaimed second single from the 2005 Oasis album Don't Believe the Truth. A pastiche of 1960s kitchen sink drama films, it starred Rhys Ifans.

In 2016 she directed videos for the single "Lights" by Hurts, and "Old Skool" by Metronomy, featuring Sharon Horgan, which were nominated for six awards collectively at the UKMVA's. "Lights" by Hurts also won Dawn a special achievement award at the 2015 1:4 Awards.

=== Film and television ===
In 2017 Shadforth directed The Big Day, a short film written by Kellie Smith produced as part of the BFI I-Write scheme by Michelle Eastwood. The film went on to win the British Independent Film Award (BIFA) for Best British Short Film at the 2018 British Independent Film Awards.

She followed this with acclaimed work on long-form TV drama, beginning with Trust in 2017, for which she was nominated for Breakthrough Talent at the 2018 BAFTA Awards. In 2018 she directed an episode of the adaptation of Phillip Pullman's epic saga His Dark Materials.

In 2019, Shadforth directed the mini-series Adult Material, written by playwright Lucy Kirkwood, a drama examining themes of power and consent following the life of a working mother within the UK adult entertainment industry, for Channel 4 and Netflix. The show starred Hayley Squires and featuring among others Rupert Everett, Sienna Kelly, Kerry Godliman and Joe Dempsie. It garnered rave reviews and was nominated for five BAFTA awards in 2021 including Best Miniseries. Squires won an International Emmy for her performance in the show.

Shadforth followed this with Mood, written by Nicôle Lecky for BBC Worldwide and AMC in 2021, shot in East London during the pandemic. The show combines fantasy music sequences with comedy drama and was critically well received.

In 2022 Shadforth directed all three episodes of the I Hate Suzie Christmas special, created by Billie Piper and Lucy Prebble for Sky Atlantic.

== Selected director videography ==
Title	Year	Artist	Notes
"Fun for Me"	1995	Moloko	
"Something's Wrong"	1996	Melting Pot	
"Hush"	1996	Kurtis Mantronik	
"Outta Space"	1997	Jimi Tenor	
"She Found You"	1997	Samiam	UK version
"Panic"	1998	Goon	
"You Make Me Feel (Mighty Real)"	1998	Byron Stingily	
"Rewind (Find a Way)"	1998	Beverley Knight	
"Special"	1998	Garbage	MTV Video Music Award
"Beat Goes On"	1998	All Seeing I	
"Walk like a Panther"	1998	All Seeing I feat. Tony Christie	
"It Won't Be Long"	1999	Super_Collider	
"King for a Day"	1999	Jamiroquai	
"What'cha Gonna Do"	1999	Eternal	
"Sing It Back"	1999	Moloko	
"Red Alert"	1999	Basement Jaxx	
"Spinning Around"	2000	Kylie Minogue	
"Bag It Up"	2000	Geri Halliwell	
"Sincere"	2000	M. J. Cole	
"Body II Body"	2000	Samantha Mumba	
"You Give Me Something"	2001	Jamiroquai	
"Can't Get You Out of My Head"	2001	Kylie Minogue	
"Baddest Ruffest"	2001	Backyard Dog	
"Living in a Magazine"	2001	Zoot Woman	
"Miss Lucifer"	2002	Primal Scream	
"In Your Eyes"	2002	Kylie Minogue	
"Freak like Me"	2002	Sugababes	
"Weak Become Heroes"	2002	The Streets	
"Some Velvet Morning"	2003	Primal Scream and Kate Moss	
"Grey Day"	2003	Zoot Woman	
"Train"	2003	Goldfrapp	
"Wimmin'"	2003	Ashley Hamilton	
"Kick It"	2004	Peaches and Iggy Pop	
"French Kisses"	2004	Jentina	
"Chocolate"	2004	Kylie Minogue	
"Who Is It"	2004	Björk	
"Dumb"	2004	The 411	
"Avalon"	2005	Juliet	
"Number 1"	2005	Goldfrapp	
"The Importance of Being Idle"	2005	Oasis	
"Ooh La La"	2005	Goldfrapp	
"Jetstream"	2005	New Order	
"Mama (Loves a Crackhead)"	2006	Plan B	
"Prangin' Out"	2006	The Streets	
"2 Hearts"	2007	Kylie Minogue	
"Drumming Song"	2009	Florence and the Machine	
"Wonderful Life"	2010	Hurts	
"Shake It Out"	2011	Florence and the Machine	
"My Kind of Love"	2012	Emeli Sandé	
"You're the One"	2012	Charli XCX	
"Infinity"	2013	Infinity Ink	
"No Strings"	2013	Chlöe Howl	Casting version
"Trampoline"	2013	Tinie Tempah featuring 2 Chainz	
"Your Love"	2014	Nicole Scherzinger	
"Into the Blue"	2014	Kylie Minogue	
"The Heart Wants What It Wants"	2014	Selena Gomez	
"Lights"	2015	Hurts	
"Wings"	2015	Hurts	
"Old Skool"	2016	Metronomy	
"The Strangle of Anna"	2017	The Moonlandingz feat. Rebecca Taylor	
