= FabricLive.09 =

Compilation album by Jacques Lu Cont
- Released: 29 April 2003
- Genre: Electronic
- Length: 65:19
- Label: Fabric
- Producer: Jacques Lu Cont

Jacques Lu Cont chronology
Zoot Woman: Living in a Magazine (2001)	FabricLive.09 (2003)	Zoot Woman: Zoot Woman (2003)

FabricLive chronology
FabricLive.08 (2003)	FabricLive.09 (2003)	FabricLive.10 (2003)

Professional ratings
Review scores
Source	Rating
AllMusic	4/5 stars
Resident Advisor	4.5/5 stars

FabricLive.09 is a DJ mix compilation album by Stuart Price, under the moniker Jacques Lu Cont, as part of the FabricLive Mix Series.

== Track listing ==
No.	Title	Writer(s)	Length
1.	"Miss You" (featuring Mirwais / Craig Wedren)	Mick Jagger / Keith Richards	2:38
2.	"Eastern Palace" (featuring Marius Risan)	Jascha Tambimuttu	1:06
3.	"Wordy Rappinghood" (featuring Tom Tom Club)	Tina Weymouth	2:49
4.	"Steppin'" (featuring Chicken Lips)	Julius Hemphill / Andrew Meecham	4:13
5.	"Abracadabra" (featuring Steve Miller Band)	Steve Miller	3:55
6.	"Give It Up" (featuring Crazy Penis)	James Baron	5:49
7.	"Eurolove" (featuring Hypnolove)		3:24
8.	"Gold Is Your Metal" (featuring Themroc)	Daniel Peppe / Steve White	5:55
9.	"S&M" (featuring Supreme Bachelors)	John Collyer	5:20
10.	"Remind Me" (featuring Röyksopp)	Erlend Øye	3:52
11.	"Also Sprach Zarathustra" (featuring Richard Strauss)	Richard Strauss	0:50
12.	"Sweet Dreams (Are Made of This)" (featuring Eurythmics)	Annie Lennox / David A. Stewart	4:18
13.	"It's Automatic" (featuring Zoot Woman)	Annalisa Blake / Johnny Blake / Stuart Price	4:18
14.	"David" (featuring GusGus)		3:46
15.	"House Nation" (featuring Housemaster Boyz)		1:44
16.	"Snowball" (featuring Devo)	Gerald Casale / Mark Mothersbaugh	3:50
17.	"I Wanna Rock!" (featuring Junior Sanchez)	Junior Sanchez	2:46
18.	"Gouge Away" (featuring Pixies)	Black Francis	3:26
19.	"Here Come the Warm Jets" (featuring Brian Eno)	Brian Eno	3:58
