= Weekend Players =

English electronic music duo

- Origin: London, England
- Genres: Electronic; house; trip hop; downtempo
- Years active: 2001–2004
- Labels: Multiply
- Members: Rachel Foster; Andy Cato

Weekend Players were an electronic music duo from England. The musicians were vocalist Rachel Foster, who has provided vocals and songwriting on Bent's Ariels album, and producer Andy Cato, one half of Groove Armada.

== Biography ==
The duo hit number one on the US Hot Dance Music/Club Play chart in 2003 with "I'll Be There". Tracks from their debut album, Pursuit of Happiness, have been featured in numerous episodes of the television series CSI: Crime Scene Investigation and CSI: Miami.

Their biggest UK hits were "21st Century" and "Into the Sun".

== Discography ==
=== Studio albums ===
Title	Album details	Peak chart positions
Title	Album details	UK
Pursuit of Happiness	Released: 23 December 2002; Label: Multiply; Formats: CD, LP, digital download	155

=== Singles ===
Title	Year	Peak chart positions			Album
Title	Year	UK	AUS	US Dance	Album
"21st Century"	2001	22	86	—	Pursuit of Happiness
"Into the Sun"	2002	42	—	1	Pursuit of Happiness
"Jericho"	2002	—	—	—	Pursuit of Happiness
"I'll Be There"	2003	—	—	1	Pursuit of Happiness

== See also ==
- List of number-one dance hits (United States)
- List of artists who reached number one on the US Dance chart
