= FabricLive.07 =

Compilation album by John Peel
- Released: 10 December 2002
- Length: 1:13:28
- Label: Fabric
- Producer: John Peel

John Peel chronology
FabricLive.07 (2002)	John Peel And Sheila: The Pig's Big 78s: A Beginner's Guide (2006)

FabricLive chronology
FabricLive.06 (2002)	FabricLive.07 (2002)	FabricLive.08 (2003)

Professional ratings
Review scores
Source	Rating
Allmusic	4/5 stars

FabricLive.07 is a DJ mix compilation album by John Peel, as part of the FabricLive Mix Series.

== Track listing ==
No.	Title	Length
1.	"Intro"	1:13
2.	"Break 'Em on Down" (featuring Soledad Brothers)	3:14
3.	"Late Night Blues" (featuring Don Carlos)	3:40
4.	"Hipsteppin'" (featuring MC Det)	3:41
5.	"Needle in a Haystack" (featuring The Velvelettes)	2:25
6.	"Lust for Life" (featuring Bad Livers)	1:52
7.	"Let's Get Small" (featuring Trouble Funk)	4:04
8.	"There's a Moon Out Tonight" (featuring The Capris)	2:09
9.	"Mr. Pharmacist" (featuring The Fall)	2:16
10.	"15.5 Remake" (featuring Smith & Selway)	6:36
11.	"Too Much" (featuring Jimmy Reed)	2:18
12.	"In the Midnight Hour" (featuring Maloko)	3:26
13.	"Moon Hop" (featuring Derrick Morgan)	3:04
14.	"In Love" (featuring The Datsuns)	2:52
15.	"Purty Vacant" (featuring The Kingswoods)	2:38
16.	"Liar" (featuring Sinthetix)	3:28
17.	"Lion Rock (Peel Session)" (featuring Culture)	4:32
18.	"Tom the Peeper" (featuring Act 1)	1:33
19.	"Love Will Tear Us Apart" (featuring Joy Division)	3:17
20.	"Clock" (featuring Elementz of Noise)	4:12
21.	"Corn Rigs Tunes" (featuring Cheviot Ranters)	0:39
22.	"Identify the Beat" (featuring Marc Smith Vs. Safe 'N' Sound)	6:26
23.	"You'll Never Walk Alone" (featuring The Kop Choir)	1:28
24.	"Teenage Kicks" (featuring The Undertones)	2:25
