= Adam Blake =

Adam Blake may refer to:

- Adam Blake, real life name of superhero Captain Comet
- Adam Blake (musician) (born 1976), English producer, musician and songwriter
