= Well, Well, Well (Duffy song) =

Single by Duffy

from the album Endlessly
- B-side: "Well, Well, Well" (acoustic)
- Released: 19 October 2010
- Recorded: 2010; British Grove Studios, London (vocals only)
- Genre: Pop
- Length: 2:45
- Label: A&M; Polydor; Mercury; Universal
- Songwriters: Aimée Duffy; Albert Hammond
- Producers: Duffy; Hammond; Stuart Price (co.)

Duffy singles chronology
"Rain on Your Parade" (2008)	"Well, Well, Well" (2010)

"Well, Well, Well" is a song by British singer Duffy, from her second studio album, Endlessly (2010). It was released as the lead and only single from the album worldwide, beginning on 19 October 2010 in the UK. As with the rest of the album, the song was both written and produced by Duffy and Albert Hammond, with Stuart Price providing co-production. It is an up-tempo pop song in which Duffy questions her lover's accusations, with Duffy calling it a song about "desire for freedom" within a relationship. Marking a departure from the soul sound of her debut album, Rockferry (2008), the song received mixed reviews from critics; being both praised and criticised for Duffy's vocal style. Some thought that it "is possibly the weakest of the new tunes" from its parent album.

Failing to meet the popularity of her previous singles, "Well, Well, Well" peaked at number 41 on the UK Singles Chart and number 37 on the European Hot 100 Singles chart. Commercially, it is her worst performing single to date, although it proved to be a moderate success in mainland Europe, reaching the top twenty in Finland, Belgium and Switzerland. The song's accompanying music video portrayed Duffy backed with male dancers in several scenes around the city of Oxford, England. The single was promoted extensively as part of a campaign of "major TV moments", taking in the UK, the United States as well as seven countries around Europe in 2010 and 2011. At 2:45, it is the shortest of all Duffy's singles.

== Writing and inspiration ==
"Well, Well, Well" was recorded at the British Grove Studios in London in 2010, as part of recording sessions for Endlessly that took place throughout the year of 2010. Duffy said that she "want[ed] to make people move [dance] [...] I played so many live shows that I wanted to feel we could have a really uptempo gig. So for me, I've done nothing, but possibly improve, and really know where it is I want to put myself. I recorded this with lots of different people and a few different locations." In an interview with Stylist Magazine, she explained that she was reluctant to follow trends for the recording and writing of Endlessly and "Well, Well, Well," saying "I'm a little less shy of saying the things I want to say now, and more clear on what it is that I want to achieve [...] I didn't want to repeat what I did before but, equally, I don't want to stray too much away from it – this record's infused with my growth, but I'm also standing by who I am and refusing to be swayed by trends."

For the record, Duffy collaborated with Hip-hop band The Roots, who she describes as "America's finest in hip hop music." However, recruiting The Roots to work with her on Endlessly proved difficult, and she was only able to secure their part in the song and others on the album through telephoning the president of Island Def Jam Records, LA Reid. The Roots eventually provided a full rhythm section for both the song and several album tracks from Endlessly. As with the rest of the album, "Well, Well, Well" was co-written with Albert Hammond, the collaboration between him and The Roots she called "a kind of a combination of different worlds there." In doing so, Duffy was said by John Bush of AllMusic to have created a composition featuring a "clubby production and up-front beat," one that reflects the emergence of a "sassier, brassier" singer. Mercury Records president David Massey was hopeful that fans would see it as "a natural evolution of her last record."

== Release ==
The song's release was announced on 16 September 2010 for 21 November 2010 in the United Kingdom (UK), on CD single and digital download formats. Fifteen seconds of "Well, Well, Well" were released onto the internet in anticipation of its release, whilst the song leaked in full in October 2010. The song was released onto the American iTunes Store under Mercury Records on 19 October 2010, alongside a "Single Mix" of Endlessly's title track, with a digital download being released in Germany (under Universal) and France (under Mercury) on the same day and 18 October 2010, respectively. "Well, Well, Well" was available for download on 21 November 2010 through A&M Records in the United Kingdom, with a CD single release following the next day. The CD single was later made available in Canada under Mercury on 23 November 2010. The cover image for "Well, Well, Well" was shot by photographer Lachlan Bailey, as part of the promotional shoot for Endlessly which featured Duffy in ambient street scenes with vibrant colouring.

== Composition ==
"Well, Well, Well" itself is an uptempo pop song heavily influenced by Northern soul. According to the sheet music published in Musicaneo.com by Load.CD GmbH, the song is set in common time with a moderate beat rate of 106 beats per minute. The primary composers are Hammond and Duffy. It is written in the key of A♭ minor. The song begins with a repeated riff, over which Duffy shouts "well, well, well" four times. "Well, Well, Well" has a basic chord progression of Am–G-Am–G–Am. The song itself consists of repeated phrasing which question the validity of a lover's accusations, the first being "Highly suspicious/Where was I last night?/Seek and you shall find." The song's chorus builds in intensity as the song progresses, with the final verse being entirely composed of Duffy asking her lover "Why you giving me the third degree?" before ending with a final "well, well, well," this time posed as a question. The song's pop style with dance influences was said to debut Duffy's "inner diva," whilst lyrically the song has been called "provocative." According to the BBC, "it basically has one idea, one note, one refrain, and it stops and it starts and it repeats and repeats and repeats like someone is prodding and prodding at your chest."

== Reception and commercial performance ==
"Well, Well, Well" received mostly mixed reviews from contemporary music critics. One reviewer for the BBC concluded that he found the song "provocative and challenging", but "not in a good way." The reviewer continued that the song was "monumentally irritating," a sentiment that several reviewers echoed. Elsewhere, it was described as an "instant classic." Duffy's voice was amongst the factors that divided critics the most. In a review for Endlessly, Spin found that "[t]here's no whitewashing of the singer's eccentricities, which feel more pronounced here—she can be gruffly nasal (the oft-repeated chorus [...] never stops sounding like "whale, whale, whale") while remaining wholly beguiling."

"Well, Well, Well" reached peaks of number 41 on the UK Singles Chart and 37 on the European Hot 100 Singles chart. In mainland Europe, it managed to chart in the top twenty in Finland, the Flanders region of Belgium as well as in Switzerland, reaching number 11 in the former.

== Music video ==
Duffy (centre) debuted her new styling, heavily inspired by Brigitte Bardot, used throughout her Endlessly album campaign in the song's music video, itself inspired by Parisian culture in the 1960s. It was her first music video to include choreography.

The music video was directed by Chris Cottam and was shot in the streets of Oxford, England around 30 September 2010. It was her first to include herself dancing, which was choreographed by Frank Gatson Jr., famous for his work for American singer Beyoncé Knowles' video for "Single Ladies (Put a Ring on It)" (2008). Gatson Jr. acknowledged Duffy's initial reservations regarding choreography, noting "Duffy doesn't consider herself a dancer but we're doing some really cool movement." According to Promo News, the video's synopsis consists of "her [Duffy] dallying with handsome strangers and causing a bit of a stir in the local pub. She's got no shame...". The Brazilian actor Guilherme Logullo play her boyfriend. The video was said to be retro and a continuation of Duffy's former styling for her album Rockferry (2008). Inspired by French culture and the 1960s, it makes heavy references to Brigitte Bardot. Cottam gave his thoughts on the direction of the video,

"The main concept of the video really, is that she's a girl who's kind of a little bit bored of being accused by her boyfriend of staying out and she's kind of saying "you've got nothing to worry about" but then she sneaks off to this dance bar and has a bit of a dance with a big group of hunky men."

The video starts with Duffy, wearing a black trench coat, walking towards a group of men leaning against a Citroën DS, Guilherme Logullo plays her love interest throughout the narrative. The first 40 seconds consist of Duffy questioning his accusations, in correspondence with the lyrics of the song. The video continues as she walks down alleys containing period pieces such as a Vespa. The next portion, described as "like a Parisian musical from the 60s", shows Duffy entering a bar, in which its customers look up as she throws her coat to the ground to reveal her Brigitte Bardot-inspired black cut dress worn throughout her Endlessly promotional tour. She then begins a seductive dance routine for the bar's male patrons, and dances with several of them individually, eventually dancing on one of the bar's tables as the men point in her direction. As the chorus begins again, everyone performs a choreographed routine to the music. Inter cut are shots of her love interest making his way down the alleys. As the song ends, the man enters the bar as Duffy sits down, asking "well, well, well?".

Idolator noted that it "straddl[es] the line between steamy and corny flawlessly." Slant Magazine noted that the video "showed off a sassier, brassier Duffy who could sell a song with the approximate lyrical content of "tsk, tsk" as a floor-filler on little more than attitude." Another music video, filmed live at the Café de Paris was also released.

== Live performances ==
Duffy's first live performance in promotion for Endlessly took place on the UK's Later Live... with Jools Holland on 19 October 2010, where she performed "Well, Well, Well" as well as "Endlessly", opening and closing the show with the songs, respectively. The performance debuted Duffy's new style, heavily inspired by Brigitte Bardot and used throughout most of the promotional campaign. Other appearances on British television included a performance of "Well, Well, Well" on Strictly Come Dancing on 21 November 2010 with backing dancers and "DUFFY" background specially assembled for the broadcast. The same week, Duffy was interviewed and performed the song on breakfast show This Morning as well as light news and entertainment programmes The One Show and T4. Duffy returned to the UK in December to perform at Capital FM's Jingle Bell Ball, where she sang three songs, including "Well, Well, Well" and a cover of Mariah Carey's "All I Want for Christmas Is You".

Duffy performing "Well, Well, Well" at her Endlessly Album Showcase at the Café de Paris, London. Duffy was backed by a 13-piece band.

In the United States, the song was performed in a similar manner on Late Night with Jimmy Fallon (4 November 2010) and The Ellen DeGeneres Show (7 December 2010). Duffy was backed by a complete brass section, with Idolator stating that "we never really tire of watching the blonde Grammy winner belt out this tale of suspicious love". Duffy also played an "intimate acoustic set" at the offices of Rolling Stone in America, performing the song and album track "Don't Forsake Me". In Germany, Duffy performed "Well, Well, Well" on TV total Turmspringen, and Popstars and in France on Le Grand Journal. Duffy also sang the song on the finale of The Voice of Holland on the evening of 21 January 2011. Further television performances took place in Italy, Sweden, Denmark and Spain.

The song was also performed as part of two live concert "album showcase" shows, including one at the Café de Paris in London. Fans of Duffy's could enter a competition to win tickets to the show and members of the press were invited to preview songs from Endlessly. The Guardian reported a six-piece band and "string sections [...] crammed on to a balcony, adding cute choreographed handclaps." The performance of the song was released as a music video. Another two "album showcase[s]" took place in the United States, the first of which was at The Roxy Theatre in Hollywood, California. Mercury Records invited fans to enter a competition to win tickets for the event. The Hollywood Reporter said that there was a 13-piece band. The second showcase was performed in New York City on 3 November 2010 at the P.C. Richard & Son Theater for iHeartRadio.

== Track listing ==
- "Well, Well, Well" is written and produced by Duffy and Albert Hammond, with co-production from Stuart Price.

Digital download and promo CD

1. "Well, Well, Well" – 2:43

CD single and digital download

1. "Well, Well, Well" – 2:45
2. "Well, Well, Well" (Acoustic Version) – 3:09

Spanish 12" picture disc

Side 1

1. "Well, Well, Well" (Digital Dog Club Mix) – 6:04
2. "Well, Well, Well" (Digital Dog Dub Mix) – 6:11

Side 2

1. "Well, Well, Well" (DJ Prince House Remix) – 4:11
2. "Well, Well, Well" (Dan Clare Club Mix featuring Varski) – 5:26
3. "Well, Well, Well" (Low Sunday Remix) – 3:34

Promotional single

1. "Well, Well, Well" – 2:43
2. "Well, Well, Well" (Instrumental) – 2:41

Promo maxi CD

1. "Well, Well, Well" (Low Sunday Mix) – 3:34
2. "Well, Well, Well" (Digital Dog Dub Mix) – 6:11
3. "Well, Well, Well" (Digital Dog Club Remix) – 6:05
4. "Well, Well, Well" (Digital Dog Radio Edit) – 2:28

Album version

- "Well, Well, Well" (track 4) – 2:43

== Credits and personnel ==
Adapted from Endlessly's liner notes.

- Nick Banns – engineering assistance
- Owen Biddle – bass
- Adam Blake – additional programming
- Dan Carpenter – trumpet
- Aimée Duffy – writer, producer, lead vocals, handclaps
- Albert Hammond – writer, producer, guitar, handclaps, bottles, percussion
- Tyrone Henry – crowd noise
- Mike Moore – guitar
- Mazen Murad – mastering
- Stuart Price – co-producer, mixing
- Emre Ramazanoglu – programming, editing
- Questlove – drums
- Brendan Reilly – crowd noise
- Jon Smeltz – engineering
- Aaron Sokell – crowd noise
- Simon Willescroft – saxophone
- David Williamson – trombone

== Charts ==
Weekly chart performance
Chart (2010)	Peak position
Austrian Ö3 Singles Chart	33
Belgian Ultratop Singles Chart (Flanders)	16
Belgian Ultratop Singles Chart (Wallonia)	25
Croatia International Airplay (HRT)	3
European Billboard Hot 100 Singles	37
Czech Republic Airplay (ČNS IFPI)	43
France Download (SNEP)	25
German Singles Chart	24
Danish Singles Chart	24
Dutch Mega Single Top 100	16
Finnish Singles Chart	11
Hungarian Rádiós Top 40	27
Israel International Airplay (Media Forest)	8
Italian EarOne Airplay Chart	6
Italian FIMI Singles Chart	9
Scottish Singles Chart	47
South Korea International (Circle)	18
Spanish Singles Chart	47
Swedish Singles Chart	60
Swiss Hitparade	19
Slovakia Airplay (ČNS IFPI)	44
UK Singles Chart	41
