= FabricLive.11 =

Compilation album by Bent
- Released: August 4, 2003
- Genre: Electronic music
- Length: 69:14
- Label: Fabric
- Producer: Bent

Bent chronology
The Everlasting Blink (2003)	FabricLive.11 (2003)	Ariels (2004)

FabricLive chronology
FabricLive.10 (2003)	FabricLive.11 (2003)	FabricLive.12 (2003)

FabricLive.11 is a DJ mix compilation album by English electronic music duo Bent, released as part of the FabricLive Mix Series.

== Track listing ==
1. Intro - 0:45
2. Giorgio Moroder - From Here To Eternity - Universal - 5:05
3. Metro Area - Caught Up - Environ - 3:06
4. I:Cube - Tunnel Vision - Versatile - 5:29
5. Black Lodge - Horse With No Name - Mo' Wax - 3:43
6. Kelley Polar Quartet - Hammer/Anvil - Environ - 5:26
7. Nile - To Sir With Love (Chicken Lips Full Length Vocal Mix) - Independiente - 3:51
8. Morgan Geist - 24k - Environ - 5:41
9. Tim 'Love' Lee - Touch It - Tummy Touch - 4:10
10. Whodini - Magic's Wand - Zomba - 4:45
11. Fila Brazillia - The New Cannonball - Twentythree - 2:55
12. Mr. Scruff - Shrimp - Ninja Tune - 4:19
13. Jollymusic - Radio Jolly - Sony - 3:24
14. Annie - The Greatest Hit - Loaded - 3:45
15. Bent - Magic Love - Ministry Of Sound - 3:43
16. Jean Carn - That Was All It Was - Demon - 3:41
17. Steve Arrington - Dancin' in the Key of Life - Warner - 5:14
