= Stuart Price =

British electronic musician (born 1977)

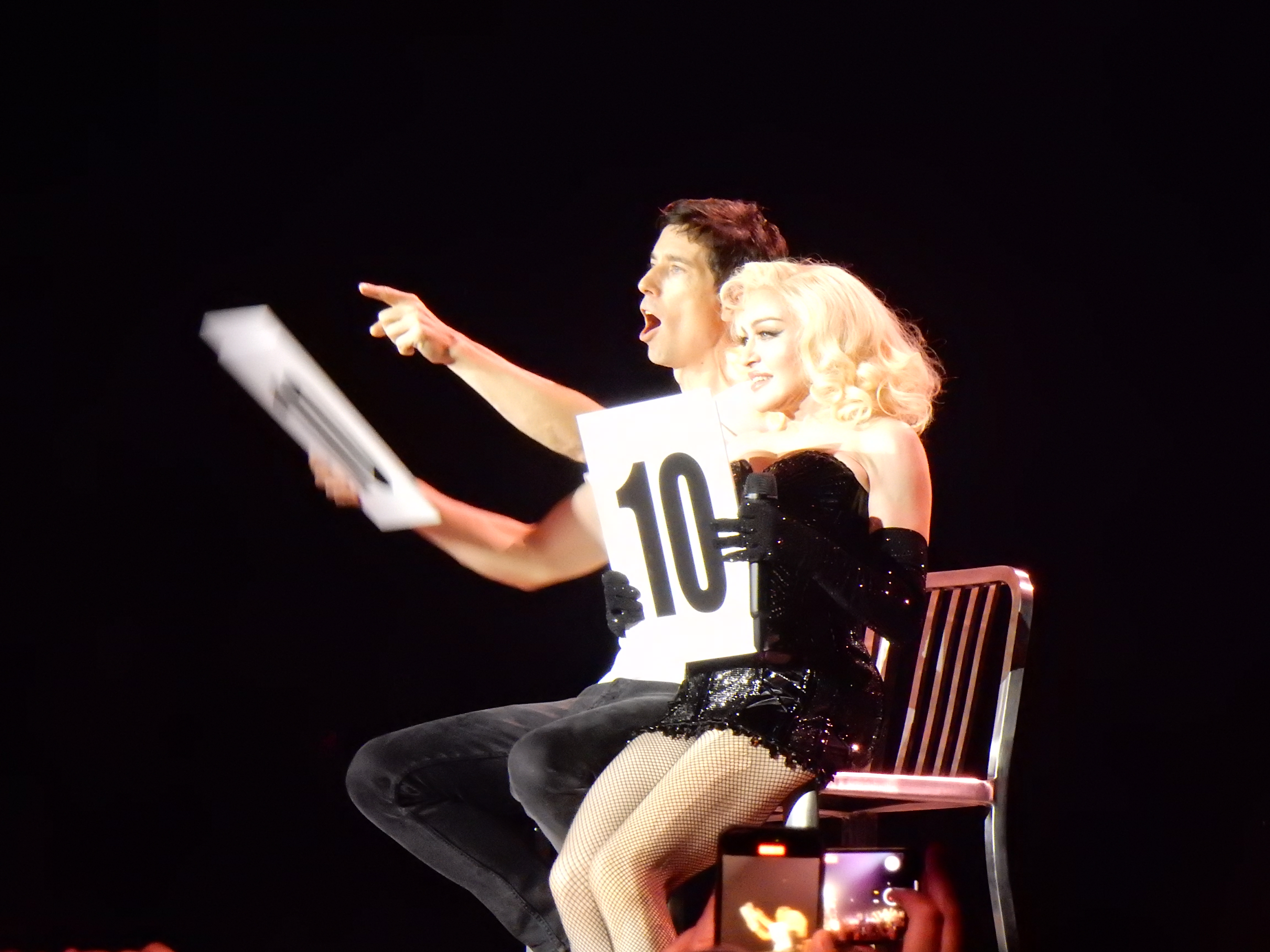
- Price and Madonna during the Celebration Tour in 2023.

Background information
- Also known as: Les Rythmes Digitales; Zoot Woman; Paper Faces; Man With Guitar; Thin White Duke; Jacques Lu Cont; Adrien Brody; Pour Homme; S.D.P. Tracques; Crystal Pepsi
- Born: Stuart David Price; 9 September 1977 (age 49); Paris, France
- Origin: Reading, Berkshire, England
- Genres: Electronic, house, synthpop, dance-rock
- Occupations: Record executive, disc jockey, songwriter, record producer
- Instruments: Keyboards, guitar, bass
- Years active: 1996–present

Stuart David Price (born 9 September 1977) is an English electronic musician, DJ, songwriter, and record producer. His acts include his own band Zoot Woman (with Adam Blake and Johnny Blake), Les Rythmes Digitales (French pronunciation: [le ʁitm diʒital], literally "The Digital Rhythms"), Paper Faces, Man with Guitar, Thin White Duke (not to be confused with David Bowie's earlier persona of the same name), and the parodic French moniker Jacques Lu Cont (though he actually grew up in Reading, England).

Price is known for his work with artists including Madonna, Kylie Minogue, Dua Lipa, The Killers, New Order, DMA's, Example, Take That, Missy Elliott, Scissor Sisters, Pet Shop Boys, Brandon Flowers, Gwen Stefani, Seal, Keane, Jessie Ware, Frankmusik, Halsey, Hard-Fi, Hurts, Everything Everything, Rina Sawayama, Darin, Romy (Mid Air Album), Mimi Webb (Ghost of You), George Ezra (Green Green Grass), Jess Glynn (What Do You Do?), and Cat Burns (People Pleaser and Live More Love More).

== Solo and group work ==
Price was born in Paris but grew up in Reading, England. His musical career started with two acts working simultaneously, releasing music on London-based label, Wall of Sound. He formed Zoot Woman with Adam Blake and Johnny Blake, and their debut 12-inch, Sweet to the Wind EP, was released in 1995. Around the same time, under the pseudonym Jacques Lu Cont, Price was making music as Les Rythmes Digitales. Initially choosing the name as a reference to the explosion in demand for French house in the United Kingdom during the 1990s, Price even went as far as to conduct interviews with British journalists in French via an interpreter. In interviews from around this time, Price also claimed that he had grown up listening exclusively to classical music, until one day encountering the album Dare by the Human League.

The first Les Rhythmes Digitales album, Liberation, was released in 1996. A single, "Jacques Your Body (Make Me Sweat)", followed the next year. It was re-released in 1999, reaching number 60 on the UK Singles Chart, and was included on that year's album, Darkdancer. Greatly influenced by 1980s dance music, Darkdancer would later be included in Vice magazine's 99 Greatest Dance Albums of All Time list.

Zoot Woman released their debut album, Living in a Magazine, in 2001, following it up in 2003 with an eponymous album. The same year, Price released DJ mix album FabricLive.09, part of a series of mix releases from London club Fabric, under his Jacques Lu Cont moniker. He made his first original release under the name the following year; "...And Dance" was a single featuring General Degree. Another Zoot Woman album, Things Are What They Used To Be, was released in 2009, and further Jacques Lu Cont singles followed, released both in physical formats and as free downloads from SoundCloud.

== As producer ==
Price has produced, and at times co-written, numerous songs for popular artists. Price has also remixed and re-produced numerous songs under his own name as well as the names Thin White Duke (originally created by David Bowie), Jacques Lu Cont, and Les Rythmes Digitales. Other aliases include Man with Guitar and Paper Faces (an alias for him and Adam Blake of the band Zoot Woman). Price's remixes are characterised by club-led beats with arpeggios, riffs, and vocal lines faded and filtered throughout the song for a climactic effect. He favours keeping the original vocal arrangement of songs and re-contextualizing the non-lyrical content in creating his new versions.

=== Madonna ===
Price is perhaps best known for his work with Madonna's tenth studio album Confessions on a Dance Floor (2005). He began collaborating with Madonna as musical director for her 2001 Drowned World Tour after remixing some of the tracks on her Music album via Mirwais. He reprised the role for her 2004 Re-Invention World Tour and 2006 Confessions Tour. Price created remixes for the album's singles "Hung Up", "Sorry" (under the Man with Guitar alias), "Get Together", and "Jump", as well as the album tracks "I Love New York" and "Let It Will Be" (under the Paper Faces alias). Price co-wrote the song "X-Static Process" for Madonna's 2003 album American Life. Price has also remixed the Madonna songs "Hollywood" from American Life and "Miles Away" from the album Hard Candy. Madonna chose his remix of "Hollywood" for her performance at the MTV Video Music Awards with Britney Spears, Christina Aguilera, and Missy Elliott. In 2023 Madonna invited Price again (17 years after their last collaboration) as musical director for her first retrospective tour. In 2024 Madonna revealed she and Price were working on new music together, which she later described as a sequel to Confessions on a Dance Floor. The album, titled Confessions II, was released on July 3, 2026.

=== The Killers ===
Price's work with The Killers began with his remix of their hit single "Mr. Brightside", released under the Thin White Duke name. Subsequently, Price remixed the song "When You Were Young", the first single from The Killers album "Sam's Town". Price produced two of the tracks re-recorded for the release of The Killers' B-sides album, Sawdust: "Leave the Bourbon on the Shelf" and "Sweet Talk". His remix of "Mr. Brightside" appeared as a bonus track on that release. Price went on to produce The Killers' third studio album, "Day & Age", released on 24 November 2008. He also created an extended remix of the lead single "Human" released under the Thin White Duke name. Price also worked for The Killers vocalist Brandon Flowers' debut solo album Flamingo, producing most of the songs on it, including the second single "Only the Young". The album was released on 6 September in the UK and Ireland and 14 September in the US and Canada.

The Killers' album, Battle Born, contains two tracks that Price produced, as well as a Jacques Lu Cont remix of the album's first track, "Flesh and Bone".

Price also produced the song "Just Another Girl", a new track on the Killers compilation album Direct Hits.

In the deluxe version of The Killers' 2017 album, Wonderful Wonderful, Price did a remix of the album's single, "The Man".

=== Pet Shop Boys ===
Price was the musical director on the Pandemonium tour, and produced their 2013 album Electric which was very highly acclaimed by critics and reached number three on the UK Albums Chart – their highest-charting album since 1993. He also toured with them on at least several shows in the Electric tour (Las Vegas and Oakland). Price went on to produce their albums Super and Hotspot released in 2016 and 2020 respectively. Both albums received positive reviews and reached number three on the UK Albums Chart.

=== Kylie Minogue ===
Price is the executive producer for Kylie Minogue's 11th studio album titled Aphrodite which was released on June 30, 2010. On 11 June, the hit single "All the Lovers" was released, and later "Get Outta My Way", which was remixed by Price into an extended version.

=== Other production work ===
Price was the album producer on Seal's fifth studio album System, which was released in November 2007. He also co-wrote several of the album's songs. Price was among the producers of Keane's album Perfect Symmetry, which was released in October 2008.

Price was also reported to be working with New Order's Bernard Sumner on a "synthesiser album". However, it appears the project has been shelved.

Price co-produced the Scissor Sisters album Night Work, released on 28 June 2010. The first track to be released from the album was "Invisible Light", followed by singles "Fire With Fire" and "Any Which Way".

In 2010, Price produced Take That's studio album Progress which saw Robbie Williams return to the band. Progress was the biggest selling album of 2010 and the second fastest selling British album of all time. In 2011, he worked as a producer on Hard-Fi's 2011 album Killer Sounds. He worked with the band for second single "Fire in the House". In May 2012, the fourth Scissor Sisters album Magic Hour was released with two tracks produced by Stuart Price: "The Secret Life of Letters" and "Somewhere".

For the London 2012 Olympic Games, Price was asked to create a theme song as the keystone of what director Danny Boyle called the "sonic branding" of the games. Intended to be played in multiple venues, Price set out to create a modular piece, "Different elements can layer on top of each other to create a fast-paced version for the velodrome, something slow for the background on TV, or a triumphant version of it for the medal ceremonies."

In 2014, Price produced multiple tracks on Take That's seventh studio album III , their first album since the departures of Jason Orange and Robbie Williams. He also produced three tracks on their follow-up 2017 album, Wonderland, and their 2018 reimagined greatest hits compilation, Odyssey.

In 2015, Price produced the critically acclaimed studio album Get to Heaven by Manchester-based band Everything Everything which Digital Spy described as "a contender for album of the year". Q also awarded the album 5 stars.

In 2017, Price produced with many different people. His first venture was with Kiesza on her 2017 single, entitled "Dearly Beloved", which is expected to be the lead single on her upcoming second album. He also was credited as Jacques Lu Cont when remixing The Knocks's single "Trouble", featuring vocals from Absofacto. The song became the second single to be released from their fifth extended play, entitled Testify.

In 2019, Price produced British band Sundara Karma's second album Ulfilas' Alphabet.

In 2020, Price served as a co-producer and additional producer for four songs on Dua Lipa's second album Future Nostalgia, three of which became singles: "Hallucinate", "Levitating", and "Love Again". "Levitating" has since achieved diamond certification. He also produced Aussie rockers DMA's third studio album The Glow, which was met with positive reviews.

In May 2022, the single "Superstar" by Swedish singer Darin was released and produced by Price.

Price also contributed to Japanese-British singer-songwriter Rina Sawayama's second studio album Hold the Girl, which was released on 16 September 2022, and peaked at number two on the UK chart.

Additionally, Price co-wrote and produced George Ezra's platinum hit single "Green Green Grass", which emerged as one of the biggest hits of 2022. The song reached number three on the UK Singles Chart and was nominated for the Brit Award for Song Of The Year at the 2023 Brit Awards.

He produced Jessie Ware's album That! Feels Good, which reached the top 5 in the UK charts and received a Mercury nomination in 2023.

Price's production work extended to Romy's album Mid Air, which featured the single "Strong", a significant hit on UK radio, and received a Grammy nomination for Best Electronic Record at the 2024 ceremony.

Furthermore, Price co-wrote and co-produced three new songs on the Killers' 2023 compilation album Rebel Diamonds, including the singles "boy", "Spirit", and "Your Side of Town".

Price has also been involved in various film projects and soundtracks in 2022 and 2023, including producing key records for Elvis, Whitney Houston: I Wanna Dance with Somebody, and Argylle (Electric Energy). In 2023, he produced the highly acclaimed Celebration Tour for Madonna, which received worldwide recognition. He co-wrote six tracks on Halsey's album The Great Impersonator; the album was released in late 2024.

== Remixes and production ==
Price remixed Coldplay's single "Viva la Vida" under his Thin White Duke alias, which was released via the band's official website. He produced and mastered tracks for Frankmusik's debut album, Complete Me, including the single "3 Little Words." In 2009, he provided two Thin White Duke remixes for Depeche Mode's single "Wrong". Other 2009 remixes under this alias included Sneaky Sound System's "It's Not My Problem", Friendly Fires' "Jump in the Pool", and Röyksopp's "This Must Be It". In 2010, he remixed Muse's "Undisclosed Desires"

Price served as the musical director for Pet Shop Boys' Pandemonium Tour and produced an exclusive arrangement for their performance at the 2009 Brit Awards. The performance consisted of a ten-minute mash-up of the duo's career-spanning hits and new material to close the ceremony. He also mixed and remixed the Miike Snow single "The Rabbit."

Between 2010 and 2011, Price produced Take That's album Progress—the band's first recording with Robbie Williams since 1995—and their subsequent EP, Progressed. He also served as the musical director for the group's Progress Live tour. During this period, he mixed and co-produced several tracks on Duffy's second album, Endlessly, including the lead single "Well, Well, Well".

Under his Jacques Lu Cont alias, Price has released club remixes for U2, Katy Perry, Miike Snow, and the Glasgow band Bis (for the single "Eurodisco"). In June 2012, his Jacques Lu Cont remix of Coldplay's "Charlie Brown" was initially rejected by the band, though it was later premiered on Annie Mac's BBC Radio 1 show on 13 July 2012. He also produced a remix of Juliet's "Avalon."

Under his Les Rhythmes Digitales moniker he remixed Laptop's - Nothing To Declare which has been remastered for rerelease on October 23rd, 2026

Price is managed by Lucas Keller and Ant Hippsley at Milk & Honey, and his work is published by Sony Publishing.

== Awards ==
Awards and nominations
Award	Year	Category	Work	Result	Ref.
Brit Awards	2011	British Producer of the Year	Stuart Price	Nominated	
Grammy Awards	2005	Best Remixed Recording, Non-Classical	"It's My Life (Jacques Lu Cont's Thin White Duke Mix)"	Won	
Grammy Awards	2006	Best Dance Recording	"Guilt Is a Useless Emotion"	Nominated	
Grammy Awards	2006	Best Remixed Recording, Non-Classical	"Mr. Brightside (Jacques Lu Cont's Thin White Duke Mix)"	Nominated	
Grammy Awards	2007	Best Dance Recording	"Get Together"	Nominated	
Grammy Awards	2007	Best Dance/Electronic Album	Confessions on a Dance Floor	Won	
Grammy Awards	2007	Best Remixed Recording, Non-Classical	"Talk (Thin White Duke Mix)"	Won	
Grammy Awards	2024	Best Dance/Electronic Recording	"Strong"	Nominated	
Grammy Awards	2027	Best Dance/Electronic Recording	"I Feel So Free"	Pending	
Grammy Awards	2027	Best Dance Pop Recording	"Danceteria"	Pending	
Grammy Awards	2027	Best Remixed Recording	"Love Sensation (Afterhours Mix)"	Pending	
Ivor Novello Awards	2007	International Hit of the Year	"Sorry"	Won	
Ivor Novello Awards	2007	PRS Most Performed Work	"Sorry"	Nominated	
Music Producers Guild Awards	2011	Producer of the Year	Stuart Price	Nominated	
Music Week Awards	2006	Producer of the Year	Stuart Price	Nominated	
Music Week Awards	2011	Producer of the Year	Stuart Price	Won	

In June 2015, Price was inducted into Radio DJ Pete Tong's Hall of Fame.

== Discography ==
=== Albums ===
Les Rythmes Digitales

- Libération (1996)
- Darkdancer (1999)

Jacques Lu Cont

- Blueprint (2000)
- FabricLive.09 (2003)
- Palindrome (ambient album) (2013)

Tracques

- Tracques Volume 1 (2013)

Zoot Woman (with Adam Blake and Johnny Blake)

- Living in a Magazine (2001)
- Zoot Woman (2003)
- Things Are What They Used to Be (2009)
- Star Climbing (2014)
- Absence (2017)
- Redesigned (2018)
- Maxidrama (2024)

=== Singles ===
List of singles, with selected chart positions, showing year released and album name
Title	Year	Peak chart positions				Album
Title	Year	UK	AUS	FIN	IRE	Album
"Jacques Your Body (Make Me Sweat)"	1997	9	38	12	30	Darkdancer
"Music Makes You Lose Control"	1998	69	—	—	—	Darkdancer
"(Hey You) What's That Sound?"	1998	76	—	—	—	Darkdancer
"Sometimes" (featuring Nik Kershaw)	1999	56	—	—	—	Darkdancer
"Safe with You" (with Alex Metric featuring Malin)	2013	—	—	—	—	Non-album single
"Feel of Love" (with Tensnake featuring Jamie Lidell)	2014	—	—	—	—	Glow
"—" denotes a recording that did not chart or was not released in that territory.
