= Intercept! =

Studio album by Bent
- Released: October 9, 2006
- Length: 46:07
- Label: Godlike & Electric Records; Amato
- Producer: Simon Mills; Neil Tolliday

Bent chronology
Ariels (2004)	Intercept! (2006)

Intercept! is the fourth studio album from the English electronic music duo Bent. The track "Leavin' Me" contains a sample of Anne Murray's song "Bidin' My Time" from her album This Way Is My Way/Honey Wheat.

== Track listing ==
1. "Exercise 7" – 4:44
2. "To Be Loved" – 4:24
3. "Stay Out All Night" – 4:40
4. "Breakfast at 80,000 Ft." – 3:16
5. "Tired of the Show" – 3:54
6. "Wendy Darling" – 1:28
7. "Waiting for You" – 5:20
8. "As Seen from Space" – 2:28
9. "The Handbrake" – 5:16
10. "Leavin' Me" – 5:53
11. "After All the Love" – 4:30

== Personnel ==
- Bent (Simon Mills, Neil Tolliday) – production, instruments
- Rachel Foster – vocals (track 3)
- Simon Lord – vocals, (tracks: 2, 5, 7, 9, 11) guitar (track 5)
- Pino Palladino – bass (tracks: 5, 6)
