= Coma Cat =

Single by Tensnake
- Released: 25 January 2010; 20 September 2010 (re-release)
- Recorded: 2009
- Genre: Deep house; tropical house
- Length: 2:57 (Radio Edit); 6:52 (Extended Mix)
- Label: Defected; Permanent Vacation
- Songwriter: Marco Niemerski
- Producer: Tensnake

Tensnake singles chronology
"In the End (I Want You to Cry)" (2009)	"Coma Cat" (2010)	"Something About You" (2011)

"Coma Cat" is a song by German record producer Tensnake. It was released on 25 January 2010 and re-released on 20 September 2010 through Defected Records and Permanent Vacation. The song reached number 85 in the UK Singles Chart, number 17 in the UK Dance Chart and number 11 in the UK Indie Chart. The song is loosely based on Anthony and the Camps song "What I Like" from 1986. The DJ and producer Mark Knight also produced an official remix of the track.

== Music video ==
The official video for "Coma Cat" premiered on 8 October 2010, at a total length of 2 minutes and 57 seconds.

== Track listing ==
Digital download
No.	Title	Length
1.	"Coma Cat"	6:56
2.	"Need Your Lovin'" (Dub Mix)	6:20
3.	"Get It Right"	5:34

Digital download – re-release
No.	Title	Length
1.	"Coma Cat" (Radio Edit)	2:57
2.	"Coma Cat"	6:52
3.	"Coma Cat" (Round Table Knights Remix)	6:39
4.	"Coma Cat" (Treasure Fingers Remix)	6:33

== Chart performance ==
=== Weekly charts ===
Chart (2013)	Peak position
Belgium (Ultratip Bubbling Under Flanders)	5
Belgium (Ultratip Bubbling Under Wallonia)	19
UK Dance (OCC)	17
UK Indie (OCC)	11
UK Indie Breakers (Official Charts Company)	1
UK Singles (OCC)	85

== Certifications ==
Certifications for "Coma Cat"
Region	Certification	Certified units/sales
United Kingdom (BPI)	Silver	200,000^{‡}
^{‡} Sales+streaming figures based on certification alone.
