= Tensnake =

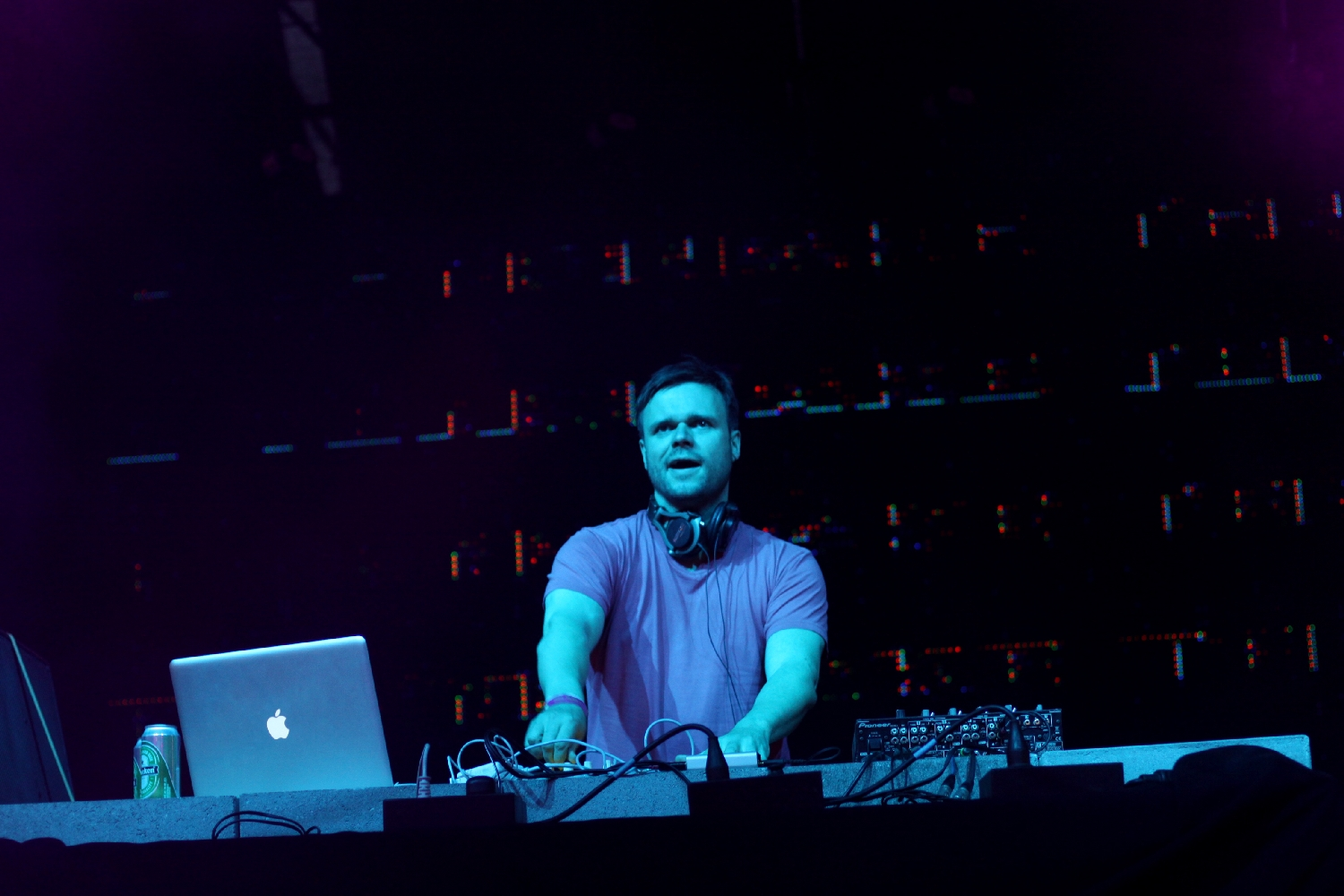
- Tensnake

Background information
- Also known as: Marc Moureau, Marco Niemerski
- Born: 28 November 1975 (age 50)
- Origin: Hamburg, Germany
- Genres: House, deep house, electronic
- Occupation(s): Producer, DJ
- Years active: 2006–present
- Website: www.tensnake.com

Marco Niemerski, known professionally as Tensnake (born 28 November 1975), is a German DJ and producer from Hamburg best known for his 2010 track "Coma Cat", which appeared on at least 15 compilations that year.

"Coma Cat" reached number 85 on the UK Singles Chart, number 11 on the UK Indie Chart and number 17 on the UK Dance Chart.

== Musical career ==
Tensnake emerged in the mid-2000s with a disco-influenced style and rose to critical acclaim by the end of the decade. He is most widely known for his popular 2010 song "Coma Cat".

Born in Hamburg in 1975, Marco grew up listening to disco, soul, boogie, funk and 1980s pop. As he grew older he went through a brief Mod phase before finding and embracing more dancefloor-inspired influences from Larry Levan to Junior Boys Own, Romanthony to Masters of Work. After starting the Mirau label with friends in 2005, Marco's first record was "Around The House". He made his commercial recording debut on the Mirau label with his Restless EP in 2006, which he followed up with I Say Mista in 2007. In addition, he released EPs on the labels Players Paradise (Dust, 2007), Radius Records (Fried Egg, 2007), and Endless Flight (Keep Believin’, 2008).

Tensnake's first taste of critical acclaim came with the release of "In the End (I Want You to Cry)" EP on the label Running Back in 2009. The EP was voted number one on djhistory.com's end-of-the-year list, and was the main driver behind Tensnake's breakthrough success. The release of "Coma Cat" in 2010 was the defining moment of his career to date. The track entered four charts published by the Official Charts Company, including number 85 on the UK Singles Chart. His debut album, Glow, was released in 2014. Talking about the album's lead single "58BPM" featuring Fiora, Tensnake commented “I wanted to make a statement with the first single and surprise people.” Glow features collaborations with Fiora, Stuart Price, Jamie Liddell, MNEK, Jeremy Glenn, Gabriel Stebbing (Nightworks) as well as Nile Rodgers.

In 2013 Tensnake launched his own label called True Romance. The label has put out releases from artists such as Alan Dixon, T.U.R.F, Sunrise Highway, Dagfest, Phil Gerus, Tiger & Woods, Gerd Janson, Tuff City Kids, ILO and MAXI MERAKI. Tensnake has put out several of his own releases on the label as well, including "Hello?", "Machines," "Freundchen," and "Desire."

In recent years, Tensnake has made notable festival performances at Coachella (2016), Glastonbury (2016), Panorama Festival (2016), CRSSD Festival (2017), Splash House (2017), EDC Japan (2018), and Tomorrowland (2019).

After a two-year hiatus, Tensnake returned in November 2019 with "Rules" featuring Chenai, the first release from True Romance and its new partnership with Armada's Electronic Elements imprint. In January 2020, he followed with the release of "Automatic" featuring Fiora, which was announced as the first official single from his sophomore album L.A. On March 27, 2020, Tensnake released the "Automatic" remixes EP, featuring mixes from Gerd Janson, Kraak & Smaak, and a club mix of his own. On May 8, 2020, he released the second single from L.A., "Somebody Else" featuring Boy Matthews. On July 10, 2020, he released a new single, "Strange Without You", featuring Sony/ATV vocalist and songwriter Daramola. On August 14, 2020, he released another single, "Make You Mine".

Tensnake's second studio album, L.A., was released on October 16, 2020. The album "tells the story of Niemerski's time spent living in the city of angels, ranging from euphoric days enjoying the city's party scene to bittersweet emotions from ending a six-year relationship." Tensnake eventually left Los Angeles and returned to Hamburg, Germany.

== Discography ==
=== Albums ===
- Glow (2014)
- L.A. (2020)
- Stimulate (2023)

=== Compilations ===
- Tensnake - In the House (2010)

=== EPs and singles ===
- "Toshi's Battle" 2006
- "Around The House" 2006
- "Look To The Sky" 2007
- "I Say Mista" 2007
- "Dust" 2007
- "White Dog" 2007
- "Show Me" 2007
- "Seconds of Gwernd" 2007
- "Hanselstadt" 2007
- "Can You Feel It" 2009
- "The Then Unknown" 2009
- "Holding Back (My Love)" 2009
- "In The End (I Want to Cry)" 2009
- "Get It Right" 2010
- "Need Your Lovin" 2010
- "Coma Cat" 2010 (UK No. 85, BPI: Silver)
- "You Know I Know It" 2011
- "Something About You" 2011
- "Congolal" 2011
- "Around The House" 2012
- "Mainline" 2013
- "58 BPM / See Right Through" 2013
- "Bliss" 2013
- "Keep On Talking" 2015
- "Desire" 2016
- "Freundchen" 2016
- "Cielo" 2017
- "Machines" 2017
- "Hello?" 2017
- "Rules" featuring Chenai 2019
- "Automatic" featuring Fiora 2020
- "Somebody Else" featuring Boy Matthews 2020
- "Strange Without You" featuring Daramola 2020
- "Make You Mine" 2020
- "Antibodies" featuring Cara Melin 2020

=== Remixes ===
- Junior Boys – ‘FM’ (Tensnake Remix) (Domino) 2007
- Camaro's Gang – ‘Fuerza Major’ (Tensnake Remix) (Radius Records) 2007
- Paulo Olarte – ‘Oscuro Claro’ (Tensnake Remix) (Fresh Fish) 2007
- The Embassy – ‘Lurking’ (Lurking With A Tensnake Remix) (Permanent Vacation) (2008)
- Sally Shapiro – ‘I'll Be By Your Side’ (Tensnake Remix) (Permanent Vacation) 2008
- Alexander Robotnick - ’Disco Sick’ (Tensnake Remix) (Endless Flight) 2008
- Ajello – ‘Moody Bang’ (Tensnake Remix) (Rebirth) 2009
- Toby Tobias – ‘In Your Eyes’ (Tensnake Remix) (Rekids) 2009
- The Faint - Battle Hymn For Children (Tensnake Remix) (Boys Noize Records) 2009
- The Swiss – ‘Manthem’ (Tensnake Remix) (Modular Recordings) 2009
- Polargeist – ‘Home From The Can’ (Tensnake Remix) (Bang Gang) 2009
- Mano Le Tough – ‘Eurodancer’ (Dances For Euros) (Tensnake Remix) (Mirau) 2010
- Aloe Blacc – ‘I Need A Dollar’ (Tensnake Remix) (Vertigo, Universal Music Group, Stones Throw Records) 2010
- Azari & III - ’Reckless With Your Love’ (Tensnake Remix) (Permanent Vacation) 2010
- Scissor Sisters – ‘Any Which Way’ (Tensnake Remix) (Polydor) 2010
- Goldfrapp – ‘Alive’ (Tensnake Remix) (Mute) 2010
- Little Dragon - Ritual Union (Tensnake Remix) 2011
- Friendly Fires - Hurting (Tensnake Remix) 2011
- Lana Del Rey - 'National Anthem' (Tensnake Remix) 2012
- Lauer - Trainmann (Tensnake Remixes) 2012
- Little Boots - Every Night I Say A Prayer (Tensnake Remix) 2012
- Mark Knight - Nothing Matters (Tensnake Remix) 2012
- Pet Shop Boys - Thursday (Tensnake Remix) (X2) 2013
- London Grammar - Hey Now (Tensnake Remix) 2014
- Duke Dumont - I Got U (Tensnake Remix) 2014
- Psychemagik - Black Noir Schwarz (Tensnake Remix) 2014
- JR JR - Gone (Tensnake Remix) 2015
- Boys Noize - Starchild ft. POLICA (Tensnake Remix) 2017
- Tuff City Kids - Tell Me (Tensnake Remix) 2017
- Falco - Hoch wie nie (Tensnake's Sutje Remix) 2017
- Xinobi - Far Away Place (Tensnake Remix) 2018
- Charlotte Gainsbourg - Sylvia Says (Tensnake Remix and Tensnake Extended Remix) 2018
- Cut Copy - Standing In The Middle Of The Field (Tensnake Remix) 2018
- Claptone - Stronger ft. Ben Duffy (Tensnake Remix) 2018
- Monkey Safari - Odyssey (Tensnake Remix) 2018
- Milo Greene - Move (Tensnake Remix) 2018
- Rhye - Count To Five (Tensnake Remix) 2018
- Lorenz Rhode - And I Said (Tensnake Remix) 2018
- Mousse T. - Melodie (Tensnake Remix) 2018
- John Roberts - Looking (Tensnake Remix) - 2019
- Budakid - No Strings Attached (Tensnake Remix) - 2019
- Running Touch - Make Your Move (Tensnake Remix) - 2019
- Foals - Sunday (Tensnake Remix) - 2019
- Kasper Bjorke - Seabird (Tensnake Remix) - 2020
- Boston Bun & Dombresky - Stronger (Tensnake Remix) - 2020
- Duke Dumont - Nightcrawler (Tensnake Remix) - 2020
- Oliver Heldens ft. Boy Matthews - Details (Tensnake Remix) - 2020
- Dua Lipa - Hallucinate (Tensnake Remix) - 2020
- Kraak & Smaak ft. The Palms - Same Blood (Tensnake Remix) - 2020
- Dermot Kennedy - Giants (Tensnake Remix) - 2020
- In Deep We Trust - Ba:sen (Tensnake Remix) - 2021
- R Plus - Love Will Tear Us Apart (Tensnake Remix) - 2021
- Mila Smith - Liars & Fakes (Tensnake Remix) - 2021
- DRAMA - Don't Hold Back (Tensnake Remix) - 2021
- Anti Up - Sensational (Tensnake Remix) - 2021
- Taylor Swift – "Lavender Haze" (Tensnake Remix) - 2023

== Appearances ==
- Radio 1 Essential Mix (16/02/2013)
