= DeeJay Punk-Roc =

English hip hop artist

Deejay Punk Roc
- Born: Jon Paul Davies, Charles Gettis
- Origin: Liverpool, England
- Genres: Big beat, hip hop, breakbeat
- Occupations: Programmer, remixer, record producer
- Years active: 1998–2000
- Website: Discogs Page

Deejay Punk Roc (born Jon Paul Davies) is an English former breakbeat, big beat and hip hop artist. The alias lasted from 1997 until 2002. He provided remixes for Korn, Pitchshifter and Kurtis Mantronik.

== Early life ==
Jon Paul Davies was an electronic and house musician under numerous aliases during the 1990s. One of his many aliases was Deejay Punk Roc in 1997. There were initially two different members of Deejay Punk Roc; Jon Paul Davis handled the music production and when playing live, the act was often fronted by a DJ named Charles Gettis, an African-American ex-military serviceman from Brooklyn, New York whom had been drafted into the army at 16 and had DJ'ed in block parties before later residing in Toxteth, Liverpool. This at the time baffled music magazines, as Davies never appeared in photos to amplify the mystery of who produced the music. The first DJPR release was the track "My Beatbox" (later featured on the PS1 game Thrasher: Skate and Destroy) in 1997 on Davies' own record label Airdog, on a compilation titled Still Searchin' - A Collection of Speaker Poppin' Electro Beats. Deejay Punk-Roc's debut album Chickeneye followed in 1998, which was met with rave reviews from press such as Vibe and listeners alike. During this he was a prolific remixer for popular nu metal and electronic artists alike. He produced remixes for many artists of the day including Mantronix, the Beastie Boys, Moby and Pitchshifter.

The project was later used for remixes for various artists, including a DJ mix for Mixmag magazine, and DJing at music festivals throughout 1999. A second album, Spoiling It for Everyone was released in 2000, with more hip hop and house influences and with vocals from A.K.P. (All Knew Program), Austin Cole, NZE, Kay-Dee-Kay and 'Choo Choo' Morales. A compilation of remixes and B-sides titled Thrift Store Classics followed before Deejay Punk-Roc was discontinued.

Davies later released music as Trinity Hi-Fi, a trip hop/house collaboration of other artists. He also had many UK Dance Chart successes under various pseudonyms including Player One and Spork. After Davies left the music industry, he became technical director of many successful technology businesses.

== Discography ==
=== Albums ===
- Chicken Eye (1998), Independiente
- Roc Fes '99 (1999), Independiente/Epic
- Spoiling It for Everyone (2000), Independiente
- Thrift Store Classics (2002), Air Dog Records

=== Singles and EPs ===
- "Far Out" (1998), Independiente
- "Dead Husband" (1998), Independiente
- "My Beatbox" (1998), Independiente
- "ChickenEye Breaks" (1998), Independiente
- "ROC-IN-IT" - Deejay Punk-Roc vs. Onyx (1999), Independiente
- "ECD Attacks Deejay Punk-Roc - Direct Drive 3" (1999), Rhythm Republic/Cutting Edge
- "Blow My Mind (2000), Yo Mama's Recording
- "One More Bump" (2000), Independiente
- "Evolution / One More Bump" - Moroder / Sanchez / DJ Punk-Roc (2000), R-Senal
- "Special Ops Volume 1" - Giorgio Moroder / Deejay Punk-Roc (2000), R-Senal
- "Blowpipe Remix"
