= Glow (Tensnake album) =

Studio album by Tensnake
- Released: 3 March 2014
- Recorded: 2012–14
- Genres: Disco; deep house; R&B
- Labels: Virgin EMI; Astralwerks
- Producers: Tensnake; Jacques Lu Cont

Singles from Glow
- 1. "58 BPM" Released: 27 August 2013; 2. "See Right Through" Released: 16 September 2013; 3. "Love Sublime" Released: 28 January 2014; 4. "Feel of Love" Released: 6 March 2014

Glow is the debut studio album by German record producer Tensnake. It was released on 3 March 2014 in the United States and 10 March 2014 in the United Kingdom. The album features collaborations with Fiora, Jacques Lu Cont, MNEK and Nile Rodgers among others.

== Marketing ==
=== Singles ===
The album's lead single "58 BPM" features vocals by Fiora. It was released in the United States through his label True Romance on 27 August 2013, but served as the B-side to "See Right Through" in Europe. An official video to accompany the song was released. The second single from the album, "See Right Through", was released in the United Kingdom on 16 September. Later, a free download of the track "No Relief" was released on Tensnake's SoundCloud page. "Love Sublime" featuring Nile Rodgers and Fiora was released as the album's third single on 28 January 2014 in the United States and alongside remixes in the United Kingdom on 9 March 2014. "Love Sublime" also appears in the soundtrack of the 2014 video game Forza Horizon 2. While not a single, the song "Pressure" featuring Thabo is on the soundtrack of FIFA 15.

== Packaging ==
The artwork for Glow was created by Australian art director and album artist Leif Podhajsky.

== Critical response ==
Professional ratings
Aggregate scores
Source	Rating
Metacritic	65/100
Review scores
Source	Rating
AllMusic	4/5 stars
The Irish Times	3/5 stars
Metro	3/5 stars

Upon its release, Glow was met with positive-to-mixed reviews from music critics. Jim Carroll of The Irish Times gave the album three out of five stars, commenting that "finely tuned pop sensibilities and a winning fondness for irresistable [sic] hooks are also part of [Tensnake's] make-up". Metro's Arwa Haider also gave the album three stars, praising "First Song" for being "luscious" and describing frequent collaborator Fiora as "vivacious" and "a regular highlight". However, Haider criticised the album's mixture of genres, saying "Glow doesn’t always flow, however, and Tensnake seems to tussle with exactly what kind of album he wants this to be".

== Track listing ==
No.	Title	Length
1.	"First Song" (featuring MNEK)	2:31
2.	"Love Sublime" (featuring Nile Rodgers and Fiora)	3:58
3.	"Pressure" (featuring Thabo)	2:54
4.	"Feel of Love" (with Jacques Lu Cont featuring Jamie Lidell)	3:51
5.	"No Colour"	3:22
6.	"Ten Minutes"	1:00
7.	"Kill the Time" (featuring Fiora)	3:53
8.	"Selfish" (featuring Jeremy Glynn)	3:15
9.	"Good Enough to Keep" (featuring Nile Rodgers and Fiora)	3:27
10.	"Holla"	3:09
11.	"Listen Everybody" (featuring Fiora)	1:38
12.	"See Right Through" (featuring Fiora)	4:28
13.	"No Relief" (featuring Fiora)	6:40
14.	"Things Left to Say"	4:13
15.	"58 BPM" (featuring Fiora)	4:57
16.	"Last Song"	4:21

Digital bonus track
No.	Title	Length
17.	"Love Sublime" (featuring Nile Rodgers and Fiora) (Duke Dumont Remix)	7:04

== Release history ==
Region	Date	Format	Label
United States	3 March 2014	Digital download	Virgin EMI Records
Germany, Australia, Ireland, Switzerland	7 March 2014	Digital download	Virgin EMI Records
United Kingdom	10 March 2014	Digital download, CD	Virgin EMI Records
United States	11 March 2014	CD	Virgin EMI Records
Japan	12 March 2014	Digital download, CD	Virgin EMI Records

== Chart positions ==
Chart (2014)	Peak position
Belgian Albums (Ultratop Flanders)	193
UK Albums (Official Charts)	88
UK Dance Albums (Official Charts)	8
US Top Dance Albums (Billboard)	10
US Heatseekers Albums (Billboard)	18
