= FabricLive.10 =

Compilation album by Fabio
- Released: June 2, 2003
- Genre: Drum and bass
- Length: 71:53
- Label: Fabric
- Producer: Fabio

Fabio chronology
Liquid Funk (2000)	FabricLive.10 (2003)	Drum & Bass Arena (2004)

FabricLive chronology
FabricLive.09 (2003)	FabricLive.10 (2003)	FabricLive.11 (2003)

Professional ratings
Review scores
Source	Rating
Allmusic	2.5/5 stars
Resident Advisor	3.5/5 stars

FabricLive.10 is a DJ mix compilation album by Fabio, as part of the FabricLive Mix Series.

== Track listing ==
1. Calibre - Venus & Mars - Creative Source
2. J Majik feat. Kathy Brown - Share The Blame - Infrared
3. Total Science - Squash - CIA Records
4. Calibre - ReJack - Creative Source
5. J Majik feat. Kathy Brown - Tell Me (Twisted Individual remix) - Infrared
6. Special Forces (Photek) - Miracle - Photek Productions
7. Social Security - Take Away - Creative Source
8. Marcus Intalex, ST Files & High Contrast - 3 A.M. - SOUL:R
9. Danny C - The Mexican (Instrumental) - Dread
10. Bebel Gilberto - So Nice [Summer Samba](DJ Marky & XRS mix) - WEA
11. Influx Datum - Dayz Of Glory - Formation
12. Funk 'N' Flex - Flow With Me - Defunked
13. High Contrast - Savoir Faire - Hospital/Tongue & Grrove
14. A Sides feat. Singing Fats & Regina - What U Don't Know - Eastside
15. Danny C - Ace Face - Creative Source
