= FabricLive.08 =

Compilation album by Plump DJs
- Released: February 25, 2003
- Genre: Electronic music
- Length: 1:07:44
- Label: Fabric
- Producer: Plump DJs

Plump DJs chronology
Plump Night Out (1999)	FabricLive.08 (2003)	Eargasm (2003)

FabricLive chronology
FabricLive.07 (2002)	FabricLive.08 (2003)	FabricLive.09 (2003)

Professional ratings
Review scores
Source	Rating
Resident Advisor	3.5/5 stars

FabricLive.08 is a DJ mix compilation album by English electronic dance music duo Plump DJs, as part of the FabricLive Mix Series.

== Track listing ==
No.	Title	Length
1.	"Intro - Fab 1"	0:43
2.	"From Home" (featuring Sound Alliance)	3:19
3.	"Nova" (featuring One Up Front)	2:36
4.	"Listen to the Drummer" (featuring Nation 12)	1:25
5.	"Beyond This World" (featuring DJ Abstract)	2:26
6.	"Squeaks and Bleeps"	4:15
7.	"Dope Freak" (featuring Move Ya)	1:25
8.	"Angelfish" (featuring Plump DJs, Plan B)	4:01
9.	"Contact 00"	5:30
10.	"Cakehole" (featuring Evil Nine)	4:51
11.	"2 Men on a Trip" (featuring Lee Coombs)	4:44
12.	"Alarm Bells" (featuring Plastic Pervert)	2:22
13.	"The Drum" (featuring Soul of Man)	3:51
14.	"The Rock" (featuring Crizzy & the Punx)	4:44
15.	"Energise" (featuring Chad Jackson)	4:01
16.	"Electrical Appliances" (featuring Mr Velcro Fastener)	4:44
17.	"Hey Mr DJ" (featuring Screen Two)	2:29
18.	"Back in the Day" (featuring C83)	3:33
19.	"Punch Drunk"	1:11
20.	"I Feel Love" (featuring Donna Summer)	5:34
