= Fabio (DJ) =

British DJ and producer

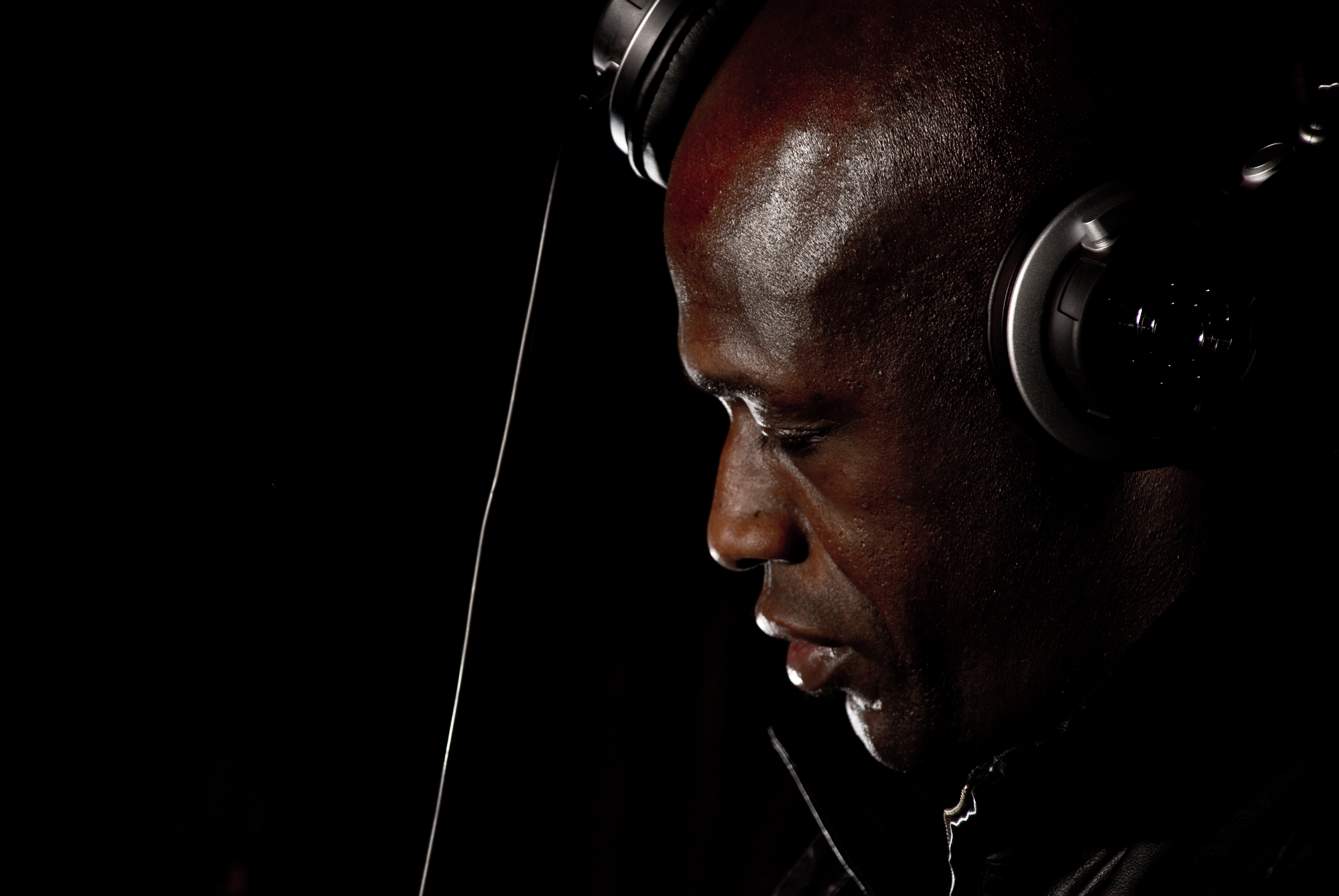
- Fabio in 2008

Background information
- Origin: Brixton, London, England
- Genres: Drum and bass; liquid funk
- Occupation: DJ
- Label: Creative Source
- Formerly of: Grooverider

Fitzroy Heslop, better known as Fabio, is a British drum and bass disc jockey (DJ) and producer. He has been described as one of the best DJs of all time, and together with DJ partner Grooverider, is regarded as the "originator" of the scene.

== Biography ==
Fabio has been at the forefront of the dance and rave scene for over three decades. He started his career on the pirate radio station Faze 1 in the mid-1980s, also DJing at Mendozas, a club in Brixton, where he would first meet his longtime DJ partner Grooverider. He began DJing electro music, notably Ryuichi Sakamoto's "Riot in Lagos" (1980), Afrika Bambaataa's "Planet Rock" (1982) and tracks from Tommy Boy Records.

The pair were at the forefront as the acid house and breakbeat hardcore scenes exploded. Fabio and Grooverider developed their sound and partnership at raves across the England, but particularly at the groundbreaking Rage at Heaven.

With Grooverider, he took his music to the radio – on Kiss 100 between 1994 and 1997, then on BBC Radio 1, initially hosting the One in the Jungle show, and then with their own immensely popular show from 1998. Their Radio 1 show is credited with helping bring drum and bass to mainstream audiences. Both Fabio and Grooverider left the show and radio station when the new BBC Radio 1 lineup commenced in April 2012.

In September 2016, they brought their long-running radio show to London's Rinse FM.

Fabio is in a relationship with singer, dancer, and DJ Charlotte Devaney.

== Selected discography ==
=== Mixes/compilations ===
- Promised Land Vol 2 (Higher Limits, 1996)
- Liquid Funk (Creative Source, 2000 [Vol. 1] & 2005 [Vol. 2])
- FabricLive.10 (Fabric, 2003)
- Fabio & Grooverider – Drum & Bass Arena (Resist, 2004)
- Drum and Bass Arena Presents Friction and Fabio (New State Recordings, 2008)
