= The Everlasting Blink =

Studio album by Bent
- Released: March 3, 2003
- Length: 71:00
- Label: Guidance Recordings; Sport

Bent chronology
Programmed to Love (2000)	The Everlasting Blink (2003)	FabricLive.11 (2003)

Professional ratings
Review scores
Source	Rating
AllMusic	4/5 stars
BBC	(positive)
PopMatters	(positive)
Uncut	4/5 stars
The Guardian	3/5 stars

The Everlasting Blink is the second studio album from English electronic music duo Bent released in 2003.

== Track listing ==
No.	Title	Length
1.	"King Wisp"	5:10
2.	"An Ordinary Day"	4:45
3.	"Strictly Bongo"	5:22
4.	"Beautiful Otherness"	4:52
5.	"Moonbeams"	2:44
6.	"So Long Without You"	6:09
7.	"Exercise 3"	4:20
8.	"Stay the Same"	5:41
9.	"Magic Love"	4:28
10.	"The Everlasting Blink"	5:33
11.	"Thick Ear"	22:05
Total length:		71:09

Notes

- After "Thick Ear" ends, there is about nine minutes of silence, then three hidden bonus tracks: "12 Bar Fire Blues", "Wendy" and "Day-Care Partyline".
- "Beautiful Otherness" contains vocals by Jon Marsh of The Beloved
- "So Long Without You" contains elements of "Hurt" and "But I Do" by Billie Jo Spears.

== Personnel ==
- Simon Mills
- Neil Tolliday
