= Star Climbing =

Studio album by Zoot Woman
- Released: 29 August 2014
- Genre: Synth-pop
- Length: 44:00
- Label: Embassy One Records
- Producer: Adam Blake, Johnny Blake, Stuart Price

Zoot Woman chronology
Things Are What They Used to Be (2009)	Star Climbing (2014)	Absence (2017)

Singles from Star Climbing
- 1. "The Stars Are Bright" Released: 2013; 2. "Don't Tear Yourself Apart" Released: 2014; 3. "Coming Up for Air" Released: 2014

Star Climbing is the fourth studio album by Zoot Woman. It was released through Embassy One Records in 2014.

== Critical reception ==
Professional ratings
Aggregate scores
Source	Rating
Metacritic	60/100
Review scores
Source	Rating
AllMusic	3.5/5 stars
NME	2/5 stars
PopMatters	5/10 stars

At Metacritic, which assigns a weighted average score out of 100 to reviews from mainstream critics, the album received an average score of 60 based on 4 reviews, indicating "mixed or average reviews".

== Track listing ==
All tracks are written by Adam Blake, Johnny Blake, and Stuart Price

No.	Title	Length
1.	"Don't Tear Yourself Apart"	4:20
2.	"Silhouette"	2:56
3.	"Coming Up for Air"	3:35
4.	"Nothing in the World"	3:23
5.	"Rock & Roll Symphony"	3:43
6.	"Chemistry"	4:09
7.	"The Stars Are Bright"	4:35
8.	"Real Real Love"	3:38
9.	"Lifeline"	5:30
10.	"Elusive"	4:13
11.	"Waterfall into the Fire"	4:02

iTunes edition bonus track
No.	Title	Length
12.	"Have We Lost That Loving Feeling"	3:21

== Personnel ==
Credits adapted from liner notes.

Zoot Woman

- Adam Blake
- Johnny Blake
- Stuart Price

Technical personnel

- Haberdashery – art direction, design

== Charts ==
Chart	Peak position
Swiss Albums (Schweizer Hitparade)	80
