= Crashland =

Active from 1996 to 2003, Crashland, were a British indie band signed to the Independiente record label.

== History ==
Singer Alex Troup and drummer Marc Childs met at school in Monmouth when they were 14.

Crashland was formed from the remnants of Scorched Earth, which comprised Troup on lead guitar, brother Andy Troup on vocals, Paul Lounds on bass guitar, Joe Atkinson on rhythm guitar, Jamie Ashton on keyboards and Childs on drums.

In October 1996, bassist Martin Maddaford was added to the line-up after answering an ad in Melody Maker.

The band was signed to Independiente on 4 June 1998. With the line up of Troup, Childs and Maddaford. Their debut album Glued, released in 2000 contained 12 tracks. Each song is around three minutes in duration, showing their preference for radio-friendly indie tracks, fashionable in the Britpop era. Crashland released two singles, "Modern Animal" and "New Perfume".

In 2001, after their deal with Independiente collapsed, Crashland regrouped with Stuart Morgan on Bass and Nick Fowler on Guitar. They released The Devoted EP on Sugarshack Records.

=== Post breakup ===
Troup has since moved to the US and has a new band, Troup.

In September 2025, Bristol Archive Records announced the release of a compilation featuring five demos recorded in 2001 along with the The Devoted EP.

== Style ==
The group's sound was very similar to Weezer, Dodgy and early Radiohead.

== Discography ==
=== Albums ===
List of albums, with selected details and chart positions
Title	Details	Peak chart positions
Title	Details	UK
Glued	Released: 2000; Label: Independiente; Formats: CD, LP	125

=== Singles ===
List of singles, with selected chart positions
Title	Year	Peak chart positions	Album
Title	Year	UK	Album
"New Perfume"	2000	96	Glued
"Modern Animal"	2000	81	Glued

== See also ==
- Alternative music
