= Programmed to Love =

Studio album by Bent
- Released: 5 September 2000
- Recorded: 1999–2000
- Length: 73:47 (European) 74:30 (UK)
- Label: Ministry of Sound

Bent chronology
Programmed to Love (2000)	The Everlasting Blink (2003)

Alternative cover
- US release

Professional ratings
Review scores
Source	Rating
AllMusic	4/5 stars
NME	(7/10)

Programmed to Love is the debut studio album by English electronic music duo Bent, released in 2000. The album contains various styles of electronic music and a wide array of samples.

== Release ==
The album was released in several versions. According to AMG, the European version of the album was released 5 September 2000, while amazon.com claims that a "new version (import)", which refers to the European version, was released August 2 that same year. The American version was released 23 October 2001. Confusingly, AMG uses the American track list in the album article, although they use the European cover art and supposed release date. Some versions also contain a track called "Chocolate Wings".

== Track listing ==
European Release	American Release	UK Release	UK Re-Release	Title
1	1	1	1	"Exercise 1"
2	2	2a	2a	"Private Road"
3	-	2b	2b	"Laughing Gear"
4	4	-	4	"I Love My Man"
5	-	-	-	"Butterfingers"
6	3	3	3	"Cylons in Love"
-	-	4a	6a	"Chocolate Wings"
7	-	4b	6b	"Wrong Rock"
8	8	-	10	"A Ribbon for My Hair"
9	-	5b	-	"Blue"
10	5	6	7	"I Remember Johnny"
11	6	7	8	"Swollen"
12	-	-	-	"B Bishop"
13	-	-	13	"Exercise 2"
14	9	5a	5	"Invisible Pedestrian"
-	7	8a	9	"Well Top Mary"
15	-	8b	-	"Memories"
16	11b	9	11	"Irritating Noises"
17	11a	10a	12a	"Always"
18	-	-	-	"Beach Buggy"
-	10	-	-	"A New Wig for Me"
-	-	10b	12b	"Toothless Gibbon"
-	-	10c	-	"Private School Investigations"

== Charts ==
Chart	Peak position
Norwegian Albums Chart	8
