= Things Are What They Used to Be =

Studio album by Zoot Woman
- Released: 21 August 2009
- Genre: Synth-pop
- Length: 42:52
- Label: Zoot Woman Records
- Producer: Adam Blake, Johnny Blake, Stuart Price

Zoot Woman chronology
Zoot Woman (2003)	Things Are What They Used to Be (2009)	Star Climbing (2014)

Singles from Things Are What They Used to Be
- 1. "We Won't Break" Released: 2007; 2. "Live in My Head" Released: 2008; 3. "Just a Friend of Mine" Released: 2009; 4. "Memory" Released: 2009; 5. "More Than Ever" Released: 2010

Things Are What They Used to Be is the third studio album by Zoot Woman. It was released through Zoot Woman Records in 2009.

== Critical reception ==
Professional ratings
Review scores
Source	Rating
AllMusic	3.5/5 stars
BBC Music	mixed
Clash	7/10
The Guardian	3/5 stars
The Quietus	favorable
Resident Advisor	3.5/5

Stéphane Girard of Resident Advisor gave the album a 3.5 out of 5, saying: "Predictable in many ways but still displaying a strong sense of self, Zoot Woman's Things Are What They Used to Be is a welcome return from everyone's favorite electro-pop underachievers and a surprising testament to Stuart Price's long-lasting virtuosity."

== Track listing ==
All tracks are written by Adam Blake, Johnny Blake, and Stuart Price, except "Lonely by Your Side" written by Johnny Blake, Ingo Martens, Andre Winter, and Sven Schumacher.

No.	Title	Length
1.	"Just a Friend of Mine"	3:09
2.	"Lonely by Your Side"	3:24
3.	"More Than Ever"	3:26
4.	"Saturation"	6:11
5.	"Take You Higher"	3:17
6.	"Witness"	3:34
7.	"Lust Forever"	2:46
8.	"Memory"	3:28
9.	"We Won't Break"	3:03
10.	"Things Are What They Used to Be"	4:15
11.	"Blue Sea"	3:34
12.	"Live in My Head"	4:05

iTunes edition bonus track
No.	Title	Length
13.	"Things Are What They Used to Be (Desire Mix)"	4:07

== Personnel ==
Credits adapted from liner notes.

Zoot Woman

- Adam Blake
- Johnny Blake
- Stuart Price

Technical personnel

- Tim Young – mastering
- Haberdasherylondon – art direction, design
- Jon Matthews – additional layout
- Matthias Krause – image concept, photography
- Normen Perke – image concept, photography

== Charts ==
Chart	Peak position
German Albums (Offizielle Top 100)	38
