= Plump DJs =

English dance music duo

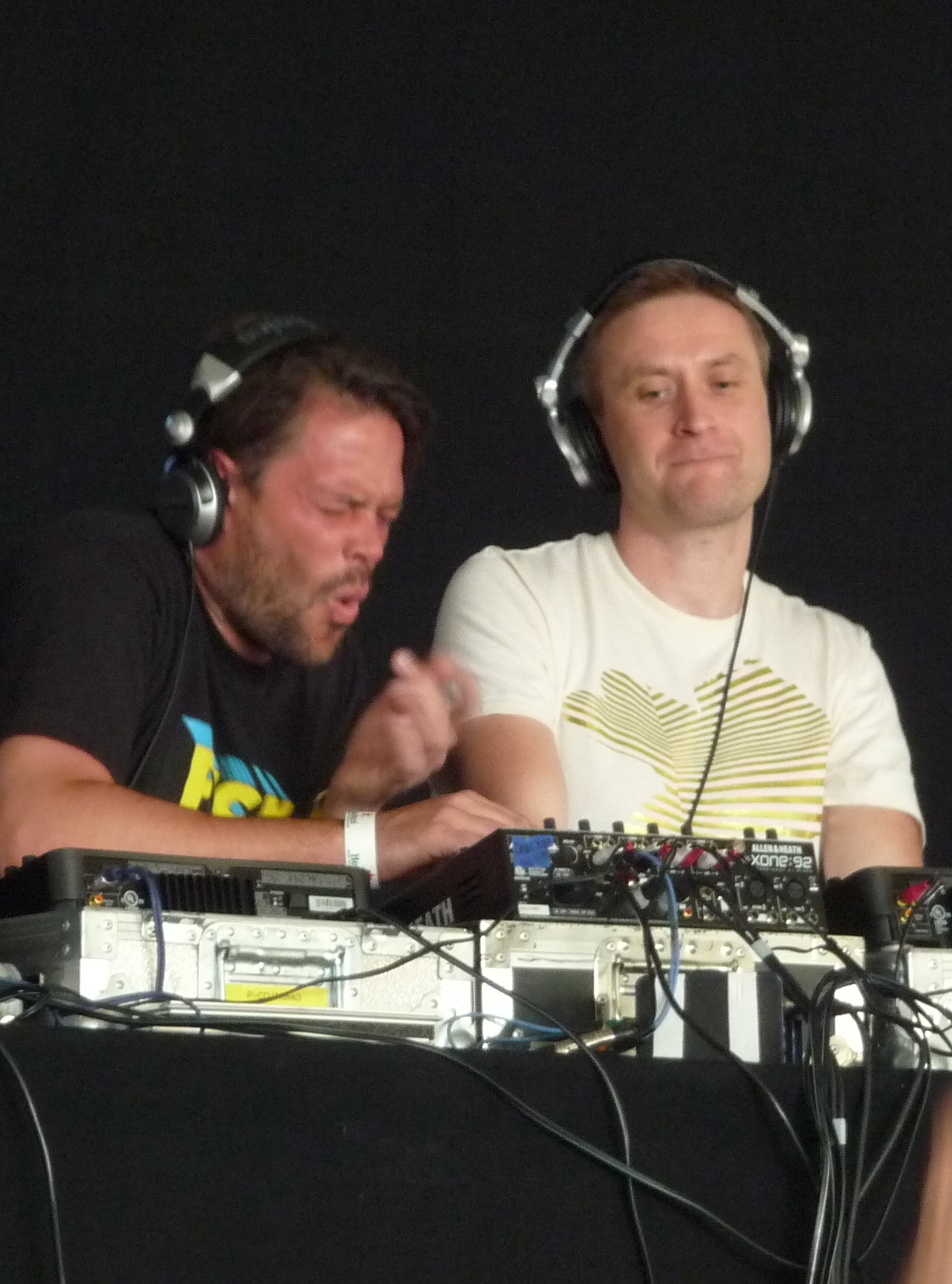
- Plump DJs performing at Coachella 2009

Background information
- Origin: London, England
- Genres: Electronic, house, breakbeat
- Years active: 1998–present
- Label: Grand Hotel
- Members: Lee Rous; Andy Gardner
- Website: plumpdjs.co.uk

Plump DJs are an English electronic music duo consisting of Lee Rous and Andy Gardner based in London. Considered to be early pioneers of the breakbeat genre in the late 1990s, they continued to be prolific, releasing celebrated underground singles, albums, and compilations, as well as remixing the records of musicians such as deadmau5, Mark Ronson, Fatboy Slim, Orbital and the Stanton Warriors. They cemented their international status through their 10-year residency at London's famous superclub Fabric, in a career that has taken the duo to the largest stages on all four corners of this earth to perform.

== Career ==
=== 1998–2003: Beginnings ===
Lee Rous and Andy Gardner met at proto-breakbeat label Freskanova in west London in the late 1990s. Gardner was making music with Matt Cantor from the Freestylers as part of Strike, and Rous was DJing at and promoting the Passenger nights in Kings Cross.

Their first release together, "Plump Chunks"/"Electric Disco", came out on Finger Lickin' Records in 1999. When they released the A Plump Night Out album – basically a live DJ mix featuring their own original music – they began to achieve international fame.

The Plump DJs were asked by dance music culture magazine Mixmag to mix their February 2001 cover CD, which they called Elastic Breaks. Soon after, in May, they released a two-CD mix compilation called Urban Underground and in February 2003 they produced the eighth album in the FabricLive series for the acclaimed London venue.

Their artist album Eargasm was released in July 2003 and featured synthesizer pioneer Gary Numan and Lamb vocalist Louise Rhodes. They began a quarterly residency at Fabric, running their own Eargasm nights at the London club, and secured placings in the DJ magazine Top 100 DJs list and won a multiple Breakspoll awards.

=== 2008–2011: Formation of own label ===
In 2008, they rebranded their Fabric night, calling it Headthrash after their latest album and opening up the music policy to other styles apart from breakbeat. Their DJ sets and productions began changing accordingly, and the four-deck live DJ show they developed allowed them to pull off more creative mixes in clubs and at festivals such as Coachella, Glastonbury, and Skolbeats.

In 2009, their contract ended with Finger Lickin' Records and they signed to release a double-CD post-breaks compilation on the Global Underground series. They released the "My Hi Tops" single on the Global Underground imprint, too.

In 2010, the Plump DJs began releasing material on their own label Grand Hotel. They have also become one of the label's new residents at events held at Fabric and Matter nightclubs. Their recent remixes have been more eclectic with artists such as deadmau5, Dave Spoon, and the Stanton Warriors.

In 2011, Rous and Gardner signed acts SUBMO & Bonsai Kat to their Grand Hotel label, and continued releasing music through this platform. Their advanced 4deck DJ live show toured extensively in the UK and abroad, and their Light Fantastic club record became a 'tune of the year' in Mixmag. This year saw them hold regular sold out shows at London recently opened XOYO nightclub.

=== 2012–present ===
2012 marked the release of "Gobbstopper" and "Dont Stay in Mix" showing a return to form. This in turn fueled the release of their Dirty Weekend album on GHR and further sellout shows at their now beloved NEST and XOYO venues in London. They continue to tour the UK club and festival circuit and worldwide now regularly in the US and Canada. The duo's remixing services have been called upon by Moby, Orbital, Mark Ronson and The Loops of Fury.

2013 then saw continuing support for the duo, as they developed their sound further after their inspirational first tours of the US & Canada. Collaborating with UK soul singer Juliette Ashby. "You Belong to Us" the single struck a chord with London design team Baked Agency, and was presented with a forward thinking drone cam video, hitting the streets with rave reviews from Vice's Noisey blog.

This paved the way for a bumper 2014, towards the end of which the duo turned their attention, reviving their breakbeat sound.

== Discography ==
=== Studio albums ===
Title	Year	Peak chart positions
Title	Year	AUS
A Plump Night Out	2000	—
Eargasm	2003	44
Saturday Night Lotion	2005	100
Headthrash	2008	—

=== Mix albums ===
Title	Year
Elastic Breaks	2001
Urban Underground – INCredible	2001
FabricLive.08	2003
Breakbeat Annual	2005
Global Underground	2009

Note: Elastic Breaks and Breakbeat Annual were both released as free CDs in separate issues of Mixmag.

=== Charting singles ===
List of charting singles
Title	Year	Peak chart positions
Title	Year	UK
"Big Groovy Fucker"/"TB Reality"	2002	83
"The Gate"/"The Funk Hits the Fan"	2003	90
"Pray for You" (Lee Coombs Mixes) (featuring Gary Numan)	2003	89
"Creepshow"/"Weighed Down"	2003	77
"Soul Vibrates"/"Bullet Train"	2004	79

== Awards and nominations ==
Awards and achievements
Preceded by None (first recipient)	Beatport Music Awards: Best Breakbeat Artist; 2008	Succeeded by Stanton Warriors
