= John Peel and Sheila: The Pig's Big 78s: A Beginner's Guide =

Compilation album by Various artists
- Released: March 2006
- Recorded: 1916–1958, 2005
- Label: Trikont

John Peel And Sheila: The Pig's Big 78s: A Beginner's Guide is a compilation consisting of music originally published on 78 rpm shellac records. British radio DJ John Peel and his wife Sheila Ravenscroft began compiling the record in 2004, with Sheila completing the project following Peel's death. The compilation was named after, and inspired by, a feature on Peel's BBC Radio show, in which Sheila would play 78 rpm records in between other tracks.

The compilation's contents vary "from English brass bands, schmaltzy dance music and yodelling, to early rock ‘n' roll and traditional music from China and Africa" according to the record company Trikont which published the disc in March 2006. The booklet also contains an interview with Sheila.

== Track list ==
1. Sheila Ravenscroft (a.k.a. The Pig) – Brief Introduction
2. Olly Oakley – The Jovial Huntsman (featuring John Peel) (ca 1916)
3. Albert Whelan – Pass! Shoot!! Goal!!! (1931)
4. Ray Martin & His Orchestra – Blue Tango (1951)
5. Besses o' th' Barn Band – Bradford (before 1914)
6. Lightnin' Hopkins – Jail House Blues (1949)
7. Daily Mail Mystery Record – £1950 For Naming The Artists (?)
8. George Lewis And His New Orleans Music – Yaaka Hula Hickey Dula (1949)
9. Mr Billy Williams – John, John, Put Your Trousers On (1908)
10. Elias & His Zig-Zag Jive Flutes – Tom Hark (1958)
11. The Seven ‘Hot’ Air Men – Gotta Feelin’ For You (1929)
12. Unknown performers – Unknown (Cantonese, ca 1930)
13. Peanuts Wilson – Cast Iron Arm (1957)
14. Winifred Atwell – The Charleston (1953)
15. Freddy Dosh - Impressions Part 1 & 2 (ca 1935)
16. Bob Richardson & His Orchestra – (There Ought To Be) A Moonlight Saving Time (1931)
17. Clapham & Dwyer – A Day’s Broadcasting, Part 1 (1928)
18. Jack White & His Band – Maybe (1939)
19. Earl Bostic – Sleep (ca 1951)
20. Ronnie Ronalde – The Yodelling Whistler (ca 1951)
21. Albert Whelan – My Brother Makes The Noises For The Talkies (1931)
22. The Three Ginx – On A Steamer Coming Over (ca 1933)
23. Sonny Terry – Riff And Harmonica Jump (ca 1949)
24. Miss Agnes Preston – Massa’s In De Cold, Cold Ground (ca 1914)
25. The Blue Tango
