= Zoot Woman (album) =

Studio album by Zoot Woman
- Released: 29 September 2003
- Genre: Synth-pop
- Length: 38:46
- Label: Wall of Sound
- Producers: Adam Blake, Johnny Blake, Stuart Price

Zoot Woman chronology
Living in a Magazine (2001)	Zoot Woman (2003)	Things Are What They Used to Be (2009)

Singles from Zoot Woman
- 1. "Grey Day" Released: 2003; 2. "Gem" Released: 2004; 3. "Taken It All" Released: 2004

Zoot Woman is the second studio album by Zoot Woman. It was released through Wall of Sound in 2003.

== Critical reception ==
Professional ratings
Review scores
Source	Rating
AllMusic	4/5 stars
MusicOMH	favorable
Pitchfork	7.5/10

Andy Kellman of AllMusic gave the album 4 stars out of 5, saying: "The band's got the whole package, from top-shelf songcraft to soft synth-led hooks to dancefloor-ready rhythms (the bassist must know each and every Peter Hook line inside out) -- all the way down to the constant flitting between exuberance and melancholia." David Welsh of MusicOMH said, "it seems that Zoot Woman's self-titled effort is easily one of the best electronic releases of 2003 so far."

== Track listing ==
All tracks are written by Adam Blake, Johnny Blake, and Stuart Price.

No.	Title	Length
1.	"Grey Day"	4:18
2.	"Taken It All"	3:09
3.	"Gem"	4:10
4.	"Hope in the Mirror"	3:52
5.	"Snow White"	3:04
6.	"Woman Wonder"	3:00
7.	"Calmer"	3:59
8.	"Useless Anyway"	4:40
9.	"Maybe Say"	3:25
10.	"Half Full of Happiness"	5:12

== Personnel ==
Credits adapted from liner notes.

Zoot Woman

- Adam Blake
- Johnny Blake
- Stuart Price

Technical personnel

- Tom Hingston Studio – art direction, design
- Anuschka Blommers – photography
- Niels Schumm – photography

== Charts ==
Chart	Peak position
German Albums (Offizielle Top 100)	87
