= Nile (singer) =

American singer (born 1970)

NILE
- Born: Jenée Denenne Grevious; February 11, 1970 (age 56)
- Origin: Cincinnati, Ohio, United States
- Genres: Hip hop, blues, trip hop
- Occupations: singer, lyricist
- Years active: 2002 - present
- Label: Independiente

Nile (born Jenée Denenne Grevious) is an American singer. In 2002, she released her debut album, Born. She listed family, spirituality and nature as influences in her music. Her music has been described as Bristolian and may be thought of as trip hop.

== Biography ==
Nile is the daughter of a Blackfoot Indian mother and a French father. Explaining why she chose the name Nile, she said "I’m an Aquarius and so Nile stood out for me. Plus it’s easier to say."
