= Living in a Magazine =

Studio album by Zoot Woman
- Released: May 2001
- Genre: Synth-pop
- Length: 39:28
- Label: Wall of Sound
- Producer: Adam Blake, Stuart Price

Zoot Woman chronology
Living in a Magazine (2001)	Zoot Woman (2003)

Singles from Living in a Magazine
- 1. "It's Automatic" Released: 2000; 2. "You and I" Released: 2001; 3. "Living in a Magazine" Released: 2001

Living in a Magazine is the debut studio album by Zoot Woman. It was released through Wall of Sound in 2001. It peaked at number 38 on the UK Independent Albums Chart.

== Critical reception ==
Professional ratings
Review scores
Source	Rating
AllMusic	4/5 stars
Exclaim!	favorable

Tim DiGravina of AllMusic gave the album 4 stars out of 5, saying, "Les Rhythmes Digitales' Stuart Price clearly plays a key role in the band, but he reins in his funky electronic musings, allowing the album to take on a subtle, jazzy feel as it honors the sound of 1980s synth pop." NME named it the 49th best album of 2001.

== Track listing ==
All tracks are written by Adam Blake, Johnny Blake, and Stuart Price, except "The Model" written by Karl Bartos, Ralf Hütter, and Emil Schult

No.	Title	Length
1.	"It's Automatic"	4:05
2.	"Living in a Magazine"	4:09
3.	"Information First"	3:42
4.	"You and I"	3:32
5.	"Nobody Knows (Part One)"	4:42
6.	"Nobody Knows (Part Two)"	2:06
7.	"The Model"	3:31
8.	"Jessie"	3:58
9.	"Chicago, Detroit, L.A."	3:55
10.	"Losing Sight"	2:42
11.	"Holiday Home"	3:22

Japanese edition bonus tracks
No.	Title	Length
12.	"Information First (Version 2.001)"	3:43
13.	"Holiday Home (Unplugged)"	2:50

== Personnel ==
Credits adapted from liner notes.

Zoot Woman

- Adam Blake
- Johnny Blake
- Stuart Price

Technical personnel

- Jim Abbis – mixing (2)
- Mike Marsh – mastering
- Tom Hingston Studio – art direction, design
- Sølve Sundsbø – photography
- Fee Doran – styling
- Jo Reynolds – hair, make-up

== Charts ==
Chart	Peak position
UK Independent Albums (OCC)	38
