= Bent (band) =

English electronica group

- Origin: Nottingham, England
- Genre: Electronic
- Years active: 1999–2009, 2019–present
- Labels: Ministry of Sound; Sport; Open
- Members: Simon Mills; Neil Tolliday

Bent are an electronica act from Nottingham in England, consisting of Neil "Nail" Tolliday and Simon Mills. They released their debut album Programmed to Love in 2000.

The duo were initially noted for their ability to create their own mischievous style of recordings by sampling their private record collections (which they have themselves referred to as "dodgy"). On the 2003 single "Magic Love" they sampled a Toni Tennille performance. Nana Mouskouri is one of the artists they have sampled the most so far. Another notably sampled artist is the Canadian singer Anne Murray, whose song "Just Bidin' My Time" is heavily used for the lyrics of "Leavin' Me".

With the release of 2004's Ariels, Bent took a sharp turn into live-based recording using predominantly original material. 2006's Intercept! saw the duo taking a step back into the style reminiscent of the first two albums, although adding a more discoesque touch. Their prankster-ish reputation is reprised with the track "Stay Out All Night", in which the sole lyric (repeated twice) is "People who are afraid of the dark send their children to bed and stay out all night".

Following the relative hiatus of the band (a Best of in 2009 was followed 4 years later by a double CD featuring previously unreleased tracks), both Nail and Simon Mills have maintained musical activity of their own. Simon Mills launched a solo project called Napoleon, with a self-titled first album digitally released in 2011, very similar to early Bent in its delicate blending of soft electronic music and vintage samplings. A second album, Magpies, also close to the Bent sound, followed in 2013, and 2014 saw for Napoleon the release of twelve EPs, at the beginning of each month.

Simon Mills collaborated with Capital Cities, recording two songs in 2011, "Postcards" (feat. Capital Cities) and "Two Timin' My Mind" (feat. Capital Cities), both of which were released on Napoleon's debut album, and two remixes, "New Town Crier" (Napoleon Remix) for Capital Cities' Kangaroo Court EP USA release, and "Patience Gets Us Nowhere Fast" (Napoleon Remix) for In a Tidal Wave of Mystery Deluxe Edition. This album also contains the Mills-produced track "Lazy Lies".

== Use in advertising ==
The song "Private Road" was used in the 2001 Carlsberg "Bank" commercial. "Invisible Pedestrian" was featured in an Absolut Vodka commercial that aired in 2003, as well as a commercial for Dutch Railways (NS) in 2006. Both songs are from the album Programmed to Love. The song "Silent Life" off the album Ariels was featured in a Coca-Cola commercial that aired in 2006.

In television, the song "Beautiful Otherness" was used on the show Keen Eddie.

"Thick Ear" from The Everlasting Blink was used in a TV campaign for Tax Credits, with a voice-over by Jenny Eclair. It was also used by digital radio station BBC Radio 7 on some of its trailers (2008).

"Silent Life" has been used since 2009 in various Impresa Semplice TV campaigns in Italy.

== Discography ==
=== Studio albums ===
- Programmed to Love (2000)
- The Everlasting Blink (2003)
- Ariels (2004)
- Intercept! (2006)
- Best of Bent (2009) (containing 7 previously unreleased songs)
- From the Vaults: 1998 - 2006 (2013) (containing 34 previously unreleased songs)
- Up in the Air (2020)

=== Other projects ===
- Music for Barbecues (2000)
- Downloaded for Love (2001)
- FabricLive.11 (2003)
- Flavour Country EP (2004)
- Later (DJ mix album) (2005)
- The Art of Chill 5 - mixed by Bent 2CD (2008)
- Napoleon (Napoleon) (2011)
- Magpies (Napoleon) (2013)
