= Wimmin' =

Single by Ashley Hamilton
- B-side: "Lost in You"
- Released: June 2, 2003
- Recorded: 2003
- Genre: Pop rock
- Length: 3:10 (album version); 3:08 (radio edit)
- Label: Epic (United Kingdom); Columbia ( (European Union)
- Songwriters: Ashley Hamilton, Robbie Williams

Wimmin' is a song recorded by American musician Ashley Hamilton. The song, for which Robbie Williams receives co-writing credit, was released as a single in June 2003. It reached number 27 in the UK Singles Chart.

== Background ==
Ashley Hamilton is the son of famous actor George Hamilton, and the now ex-stepson of legendary singer Rod Stewart. After reportedly meeting British singer and former Take That band member Robbie Williams at an Alcoholics Anonymous meeting - a claim which Hamilton has denied - Williams and Hamilton wrote the song together. After recording the song, it was released as a single, charting within the top 40 in the United Kingdom and reaching a peak of number 27.

== Track listing ==
UK CD 1
No.	Title	Writer(s)	{{{extra_column}}}	Length
1.	"Wimmin'" (album version)	Ashley Hamilton, Robbie Williams		3:10
2.	"Lost in You" (album version)	Ashley Hamilton
3.	"Wimmin'" (D-Bop club mix)	Ashley Hamilton, Robbie Williams	remix credited to Andy Allder and Dave Cross	7:06
4.	"Wimmin'" (music video)	Ashley Hamilton, Robbie Williams

UK CD 2
No.	Title	Writer(s)	Length
1.	"Wimmin'" (radio edit)	Ashley Hamilton, Robbie Williams	3:08
2.	"America" (demo version)	Ashley Hamilton, Boots Ottestadt	3:12
3.	"Get with Me" (demo version)	Ashley Hamilton, Boots Ottestadt	3:04

Europe CD/Maxi-single
No.	Title	Writer(s)	{{{extra_column}}}	Length
1.	"Wimmin'" (album version)	Ashley Hamilton, Robbie Williams		3:10
2.	"Wimmin'" (D-Bop club remix)	Ashley Hamilton, Robbie Williams	remix credited to Andy Allder and Dave Cross	7:06
3.	"America" (demo version)	Ashley Hamilton, Boots Ottestadt		3:21
4.	"Get with Me" (demo version)	Ashley Hamilton, Boots Ottestadt		3:05

== Charts ==
Chart (2004)	Peak position
UK Singles (OCC)	27
