= Zoot Woman =

British electronic music group

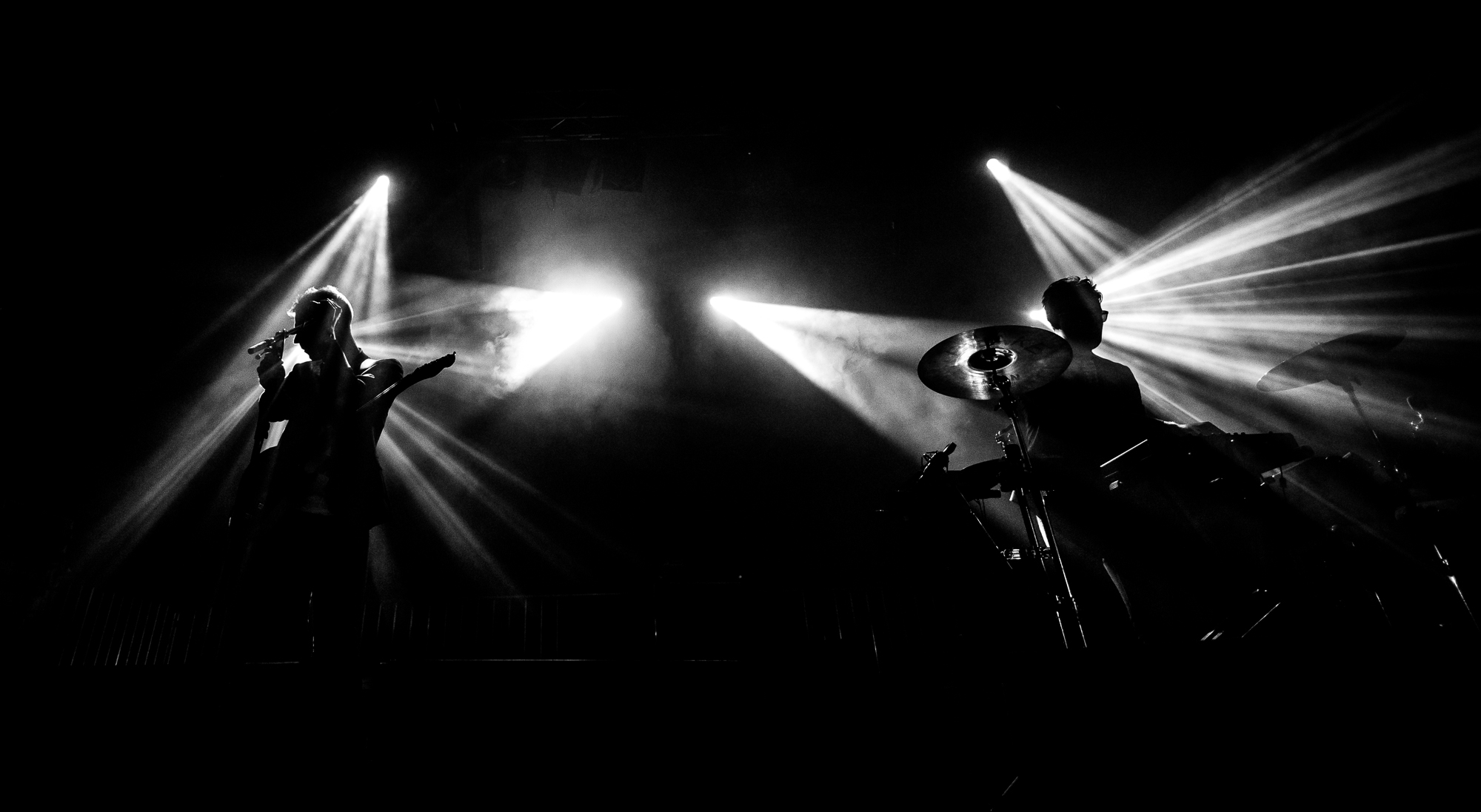
- Zoot Woman performing live in 2015. From left to right: Johnny Blake, Adam Blake

Background information
- Origin: Reading, Berkshire, England
- Genres: Electronic; electropop; indie pop; indietronica; synthpop
- Years active: 1996–present
- Labels: BMG; Embassy of Music; Wall of Sound [PIAS]; ZWR
- Members: Adam Blake; Johnny Blake; Stuart Price
- Website: www.zootwoman.com

Zoot Woman is a British electronic music group comprising members Adam Blake, Johnny Blake and Stuart Price.

Their debut studio album Living in a Magazine was released by Wall of Sound [PIAS] backed by singles "It's Automatic" and "Living in a Magazine". Their second eponymous album features the singles "Grey Day" and "Taken It All".

Zoot Woman songs have been remixed by Todd Edwards, Le Knight Club featuring Guy-Manuel de Homem-Christo of Daft Punk, Adam Port, Michael Mayer, Ben Böhmer, Boris Dlugosch, Ninetoes, Chopstick & Johnjon.

Price and Adam Blake also remix under the alias Paper Faces, as well as individually, and have reworked tracks for Zoot Woman and recording artists such as Madonna, Kylie Minogue, Scissor Sisters, Armand Van Helden, and Chromeo.

Electronic music group Zoot Woman performing live in 2026

== History ==
=== Living in a Magazine (2001) ===
With the release of the conceptual debut album Living in A Magazine in 2001, Zoot Woman established themselves on the music scene, releasing the singles "It's Automatic" and "Living in a Magazine". The album's pop sensibility is evident on tracks such as "Jessie", "Holiday Home" and "Information First". Simon Price of The Independent wrote, "This is the sound of minor-key heartbreak in departure lounges and penthouse suites, an album which should come with "New York, London, Paris, Munich" embossed on the sleeve."

Their track "It's Automatic" has been sampled by several hip hop music artists, including JD Era, while possibly the most well-known cover of "It's Automatic" is by Mickey Factz featuring Curtis Santiago, due to its use in an online car commercial.

=== Zoot Woman (2003) ===
A significant departure from the bright, pop feel of Living in a Magazine, Zoot Woman's eponymous second album remains faithful to the musical qualities that made their debut record. Zoot Woman features the singles "Grey Day" and "Taken It All". "Gem" from this album was used in the Kate Moss/Rimmel Cosmetics TV advertising campaign and "Calmer" appears in an episode of the CBS TV drama CSI.

The song "Hope in the Mirror" was featured in the soundtrack to Mack Dawg Productions 2004 snowboard video Chulksmack, in the Jussi Oksanen section of the film. Their track "Grey Day" appeared in David Benedek's film 91 Words for Snow (2006, Blank Paper Studio). This helped spread the word to the snowboard community.

=== Things Are What They Used to Be (2009) ===
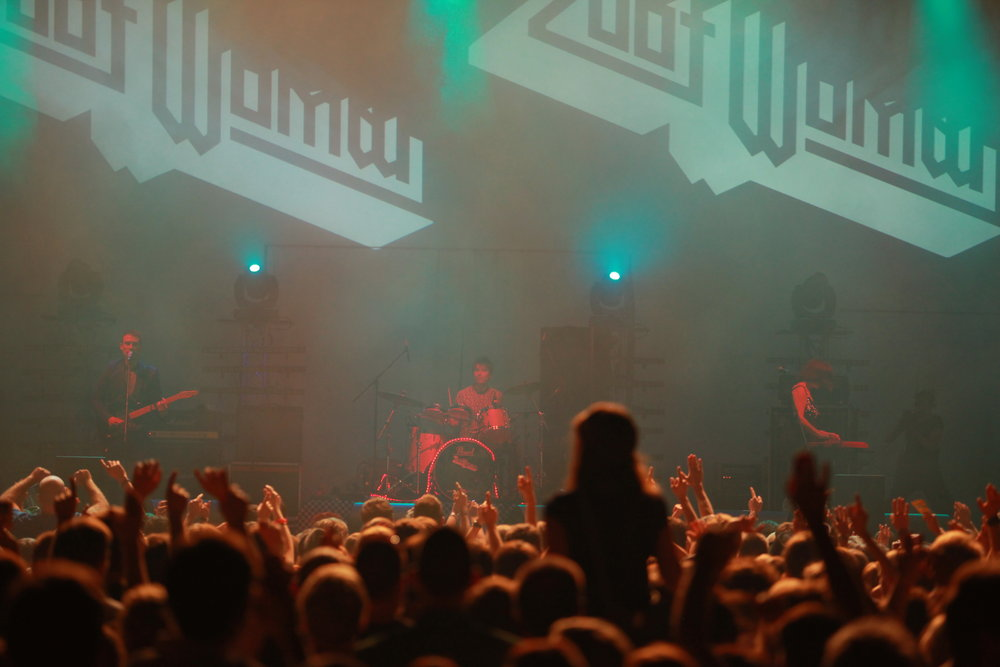
Zoot Woman in 2009. From left to right: Johnny Blake, Adam Blake and Jasmin O'Meara

In December 2007, a new single titled "We Won't Break" was released as a free download on RCRD LBL. The single was accompanied by a music video directed by Mirjam Baker and Michael Kren. In March 2008, the band made a second single ("Live in My Head") available for download on their Myspace page. Both songs are featured on their third album, Things Are What They Used to Be, which was released on 21 August 2009 by Zoot Woman's own record label, ZWR. Other singles include "Just a Friend of Mine", "More Than Ever", "Memory", and "Live in My Head".

Well received by critics; NME rated the album 8/10 with Camilla Pia writing, "The electro-clash survivors are at their most impressive yet: combining rip-your-heart-out lyrics with instantly singable melodies and frosty synths, all tinged with the occasional flurry of string and disco riffs. This is a masterclass in modern electronic music, finessed by innovation and emotional depth."

The Guardian's Dave Simpson wrote, "'More Than Ever' wraps undying love up in big keyboard stabs, 'Witness' is an effective moody stomp, and 'Lonely By Your Side' – a personal/existential crisis in a three-minute pop song – can hold its head up among their heroes."

=== Star Climbing (2014) ===
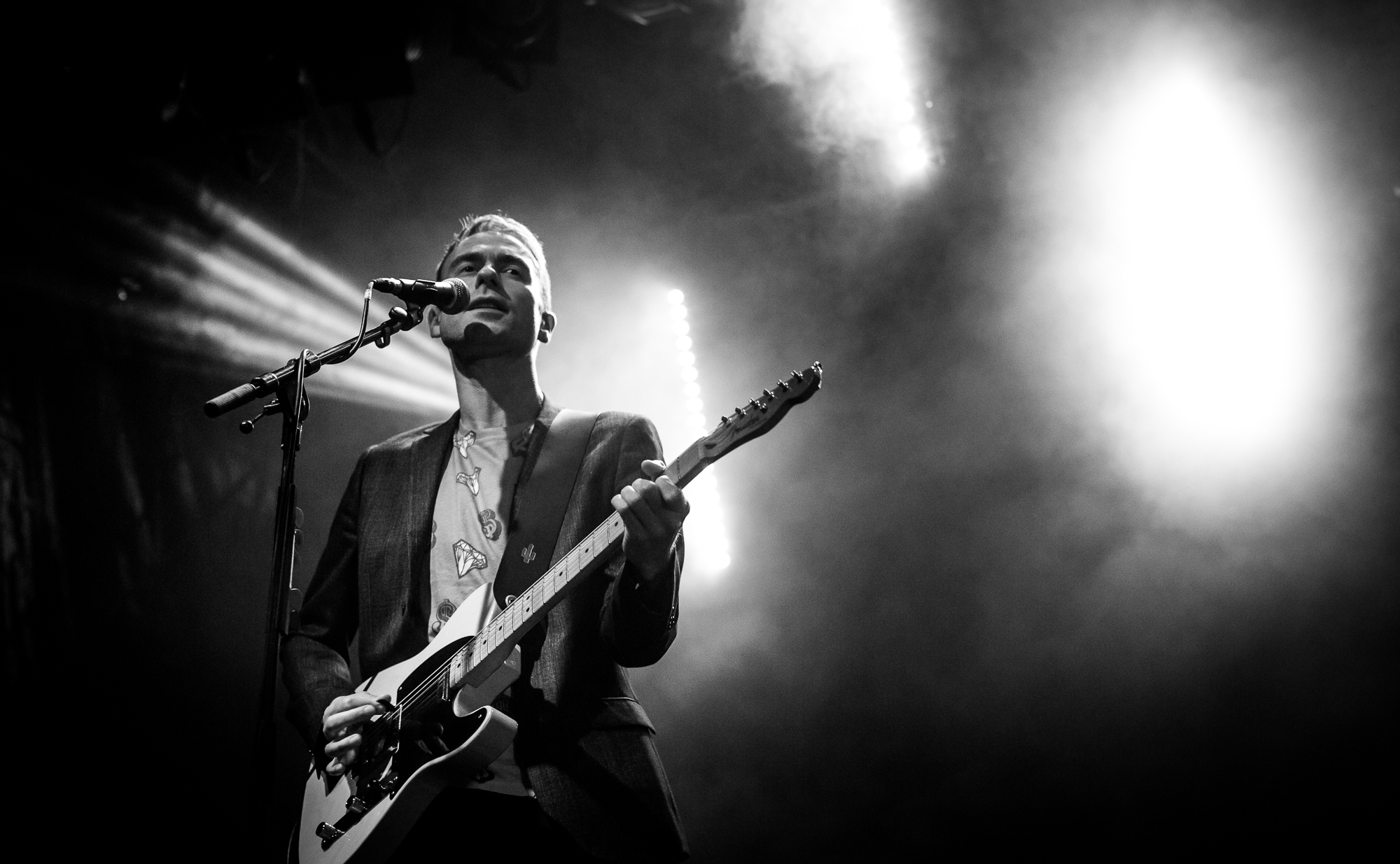
Johnny Blake Live In 2015

On 1 January 2013, the band announced on Facebook and Twitter that they look forward to introducing and touring the new album Star Climbing. On 11 December 2013, Zoot Woman's new single, "The Stars Are Bright" was made available on iTunes, nearly one year after the initial album announcement.

Other singles from Star Climbing include the song "Don't Tear Yourself Apart". The latter is described by critics as "a ravishing melody paired with the unmistakable vocals of Johnny Blake." It was recorded in a similar way to "It's Automatic", minimal music, simple song, written on an old Casio synthesizer and Roland TR-909 drum machine.

Stuart Price said in a statement, "We recorded Star Climbing over a three-year period between our studios, working on songs and lyrics until we felt like we had found the albums direction. It is our most distinctive album to date, combining all our different tastes and styles into one."

Adam Blake of Zoot Woman live in 2026

=== Absence (2017) ===
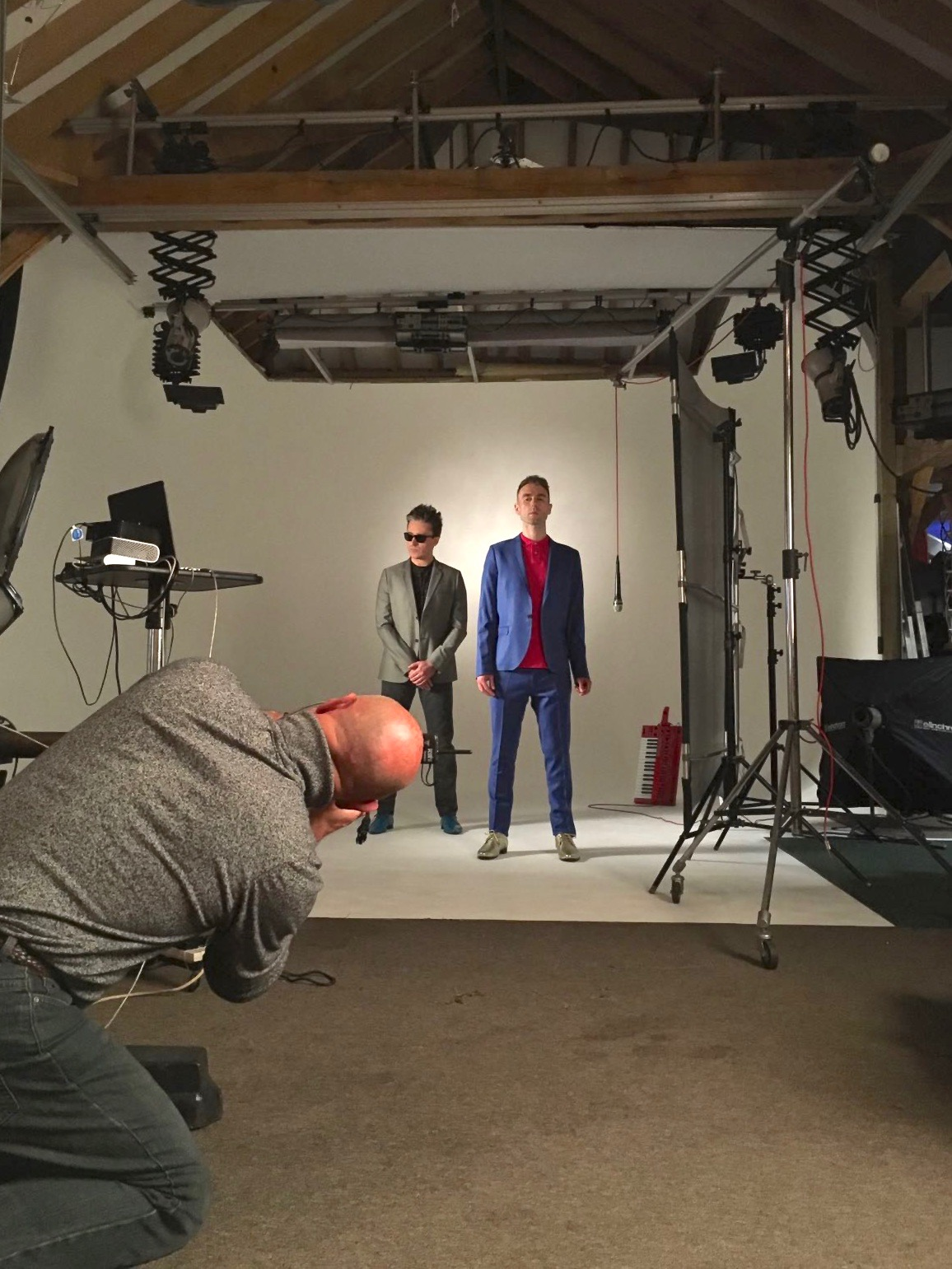
Zoot Woman at a promotional photo session in 2017

In 2016, Zoot Woman started a social media campaign uploading short segments of 'songs in the making' that would eventually become the album Absence - including ‘Haunt Me’, ‘Ordinary Face’ and ‘I Said It Again’. Absence was the band’s fifth album, the first to feature collaborative songs - most notably, Kylie Minogue featured on the track 'Still Feels Like The First Time'. The album released on June 16, 2017, under ZWR worldwide under licence to Snowhite Records, who are based in Berlin, Germany.

=== Redesigned (2018) ===
At the end of 2017, Zoot Woman announced plans for the production of Redesigned. The band's sixth album features new versions of previously released songs recorded in a different style. Fifteen tracks in total, three from each of the five albums released to date, Living in A Magazine, Zoot Woman, Things Are What They Used to Be, Star Climbing & Absence. 'Redesigned' is an album of predominantly acoustic versions of the band's songs.

In 2021, a collaboration between Solomun and Zoot Woman was released. "Out Of Focus" features on Solomun's album Nobody Is Not Loved (BMG)

=== Maxidrama (2024) ===
In 2019, the band announced that work had begun on their next album Maxidrama. The songs "Where Is The Man" and "Never Felt This Way" were released as precursors to the album. Titles include ‘Another Time Like Now’, 'Blind', 'Live And Learn' and 'Phenomenal'.

== Musical style ==
Johnny Blake of Zoot Woman live in 2026

Zoot Woman's main genres are electronica, alternative rock and synthpop. Heavy use of both digital and analogue synthesizers as well as drum machines is evident on each album. They are known to blend the use of acoustic and electronic instruments to create their sound.

Many Zoot Woman songs are characterised by lead vocalist Johnny Blake's voice. Blake supports his vocal with a very rhythmic guitar playing style. For live performances, he favours the Fender Telecaster and Gibson SG guitars. He has written and collaborated with different artists including Justice on the albums Woman & Woman Worldwide.

Zoot Woman cite the bands Kraftwerk, Depeche Mode, Steely Dan and The Police among their influences.

In an interview with Universal Audio, Adam Blake discusses some of the group's recording techniques.

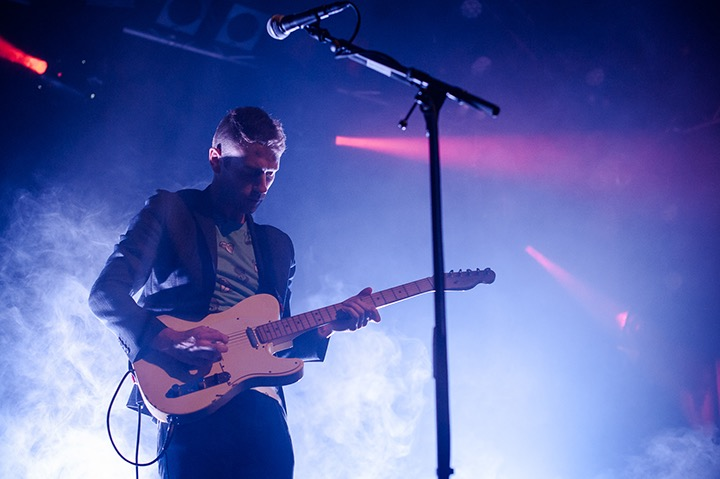
Johnny Blake Live In Switzerland, 2015

== Lyrics ==
Zoot Woman song lyrics have been described as melancholic. Often the subject matter in each song centres around love, relationships or more introspective and personal themes.

== Band's image ==
Image is a key conceptual element to the band's output. Johnny Blake is quoted saying, "We've always said we want to look how we sound, so hopefully, the look of the band could translate the music. But I think Zoot Woman is built foremost around the songs. There are bands out there where the show describes the band more than the actual music, but with Zoot Woman it's vice versa."

Zoot Woman have worked with acclaimed video directors Dawn Shadforth, Uwe Flade, Michael Kren, Mirjam Baker and Mike Mills. With photography by Rankin, Sølve Sundsbø, Ben Rigby, Matthias Krause, Normen Perke and styling by fashion designer Fee Doran aka "Mrs Jones".

== Band members ==
- Johnny Blake – vocals, guitar, synthesizers
- Adam Blake – synthesizers, drums, percussion, bass, guitar, backing vocals
- Stuart Price – synthesizers, bass, guitar

Touring musicians

- Ian Markin – drums (2001–2002)
- Jon Fortis – bass, keyboards (2001–2002)
- Jim Carmichael – drums (2003–2004)
- Beatrice Hatherley – bass, keyboards (2004–2007)
- Jasmin O'Meara – bass, keyboards (2008–2011)

== Discography ==
=== Albums ===
Year	Album details	Peak chart positions
Year	Album details	GER
2001	Living in a Magazine: Released: 28 May 2001; Label: Wall of Sound	—
2003	Zoot Woman: Released: 22 September 2003; Label: Wall of Sound	—
2009	Things Are What They Used to Be: Released: 21 August 2009; Label: ZWR	38
2014	Star Climbing: Released: 29 August 2014; Label: Embassy One	—
2017	Absence: Released: 16 June 2017; Label: ZWR	—
2018	Redesigned: Released: 31 August 2018; Label: ZWR	—
2024	Maxidrama: Released: 21 June 2024; Label: ZWR	—

=== Collaborations ===
- 2024 – "I Feel Magic" – Einmusik feat. Zoot Woman
- 2023 – "A Habit I Can't Break" – Daddy Squad feat. Zoot Woman
- 2022 – "Reinvention" – Moscoman feat. Zoot Woman
- 2022 – "Something Unique" – Iron Curtis & Johannes Albert feat. Zoot Woman
- 2021 – "Out Of Focus" – Solomun feat. Zoot Woman
- 2017 – "Still Feels Like The First Time" – Zoot Woman feat. Kylie Minogue
- 2016 – "Stop" – Justice feat. Johnny Blake

=== EP ===
- 1996 – Sweet to the Wind

=== Singles ===
From Maxidrama

- 2024 – "Another Time Like Now"
- 2023 – "Blind"
- 2023 – "Live And Learn"
- 2023 – "A Habit I Can't Break"
- 2021 – "Never Felt This Way"
- 2019 – "Where Is The Man"

From Absence

- 2017 – "Solid Gold"
- 2017 – "Ordinary Face"

From Star Climbing

- 2014 – "Coming Up For Air"
- 2014 – "Don't Tear Yourself Apart"
- 2013 – "The Stars Are Bright"

From Things Are What They Used To Be

- 2010 – "More Than Ever"
- 2009 – "Memory"
- 2009 – "Just A Friend of Mine"
- 2009 – "We Won't Break" (Redone) / "Saturation"
- 2008 – "Live in My Head"
- 2007 – "We Won't Break"

From Zoot Woman

- 2004 – "Taken It All"
- 2003 – "Gem"
- 2003 – "Grey Day"

From Living in a Magazine

- 2001 – "Living in a Magazine"
- 2001 – "You & I"
- 2000 – "It's Automatic"

Non-album single

- 1997 – "Chasing Cities"
