= Ariels (album) =

Studio album by Bent
- Released: October 12, 2004
- Length: 65:12
- Label: Open/Ministry of Sound
- Producer: Bent

Bent chronology
FabricLive.11 (2003)	Ariels (2004)	Intercept! (2006)

Professional ratings
Review scores
Source	Rating
BBC	positive

Ariels is the third studio album from the English musical group Bent, released October 12, 2004, through Open/Ministry of Sound. There is a stronger element of acoustic instruments present on the album than the previous releases, and the earlier extensive use of samples has been toned down.

== Track listing ==
1. "Comin' Back" – 4:39
2. "Sunday 29th" – 4:09
3. "I Can't Believe It's Over" – 4:15
4. "As You Fall" – 3:35
5. "Silent Life" – 4:57
6. "Sing Me" – 5:15
7. "On The Lake" – 3:18
8. "Now I Must Remember" – 4:46
9. "You Are the Oscillator" – 3:48
10. "Sunday Boy" – 5:50
11. "Exercise 4" – 5:43
12. "The Waters Deep" – 8:30

== Personnel ==
=== Bent ===
- Simon Mills – writer, producer, engineer, programmer
- Neil Tolliday – writer, producer, engineer, programmer

=== Additional musicians ===
- Katty Heath – vocals
- Sian Evans – vocals
- Rachel Foster – vocals
- Steve Edwards – vocals
- BJ Cole – pedal steel guitar, E-bow guitar
- John Thompson – Fender bass, upright bass, guitar
- Gareth Bailey – brass, percussion
- Paul Cole – percussion, drums
- Rhodri Davies – harp
- Dorian Conway – flute
- Arwel Hughes – upright bass
- Darrin Mooney – drums
- Gavin Wright – violin
- Julian Leaper – violin
- Bruce White – viola
- Dave Daniels - cello

=== Additional production ===
- Dave Bascombe – mixing, recording
