= Adam Blake (musician) =

English producer, musician and songwriter

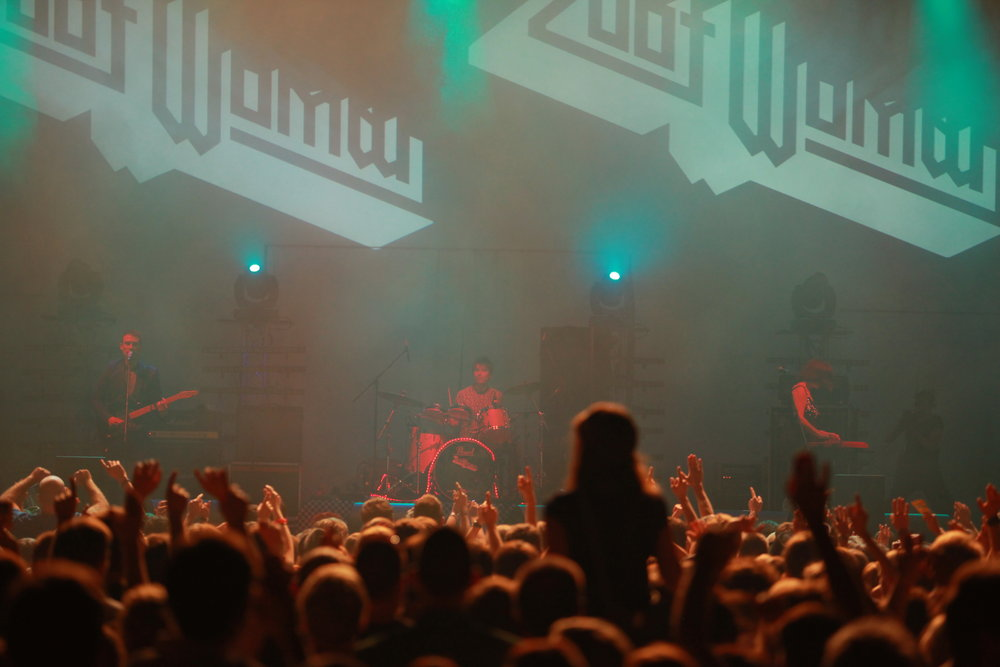
- Adam Blake (centre) performing in 2009

Background information
- Born: Adam John Blake; 25 January 1976 (age 50); Reading, England
- Genres: Electronic, dance, alternative, pop
- Occupations: Musician, songwriter, composer
- Instruments: Synthesizer, drums, bass, guitar
- Years active: 1996–present
- Label: ZWR
- Website: zootwoman.com

Adam Blake (born Adam John Blake, 25 January 1976, Reading, Berkshire, England) is an English producer, musician and songwriter, best known as a founder member of the electronic music band Zoot Woman. He produces remixes under the aliases Paper Faces (with Stuart Price), Sloop John Barillo, and Mad March Hare. Paper Faces have reworked tracks for Zoot Woman as well as other established recording artists such as Madonna, Scissor Sisters, Armand Van Helden, Chromeo, and Frankmusik. He has worked on records for artists such as Pet Shop Boys, Duffy, Seal, and Kylie Minogue. In an interview with Universal Audio, he discusses recording techniques.

== Discography ==
=== Albums ===
Year	Album details	Peak chart positions
Year	Album details	GER
2001	Living in a Magazine: Released: 28 May 2001; Label: Wall of Sound	—
2003	Zoot Woman: Released: 22 September 2003; Label: Wall of Sound	—
2009	Things Are What They Used to Be: Released: 21 August 2009; Label: Zoot Woman	38
2014	Star Climbing: Released: 29 August 2014; Label: Embassy One	–

=== Singles ===
From Star Climbing

- 2014 – Coming Up For Air
- 2014 – Don't Tear Yourself Apart
- 2013 – The Stars Are Bright

From Things Are What They Used To Be

- 2010 – More Than Ever
- 2009 – Memory
- 2009 – Just A Friend of Mine
- 2009 – We Won't Break (Redone)/Saturation
- 2008 – Live in My Head
- 2007 – We Won't Break

From Zoot Woman

- 2004 – Taken It All
- 2003 – Gem
- 2003 – Grey Day

From Living in a Magazine

- 2001 – Living in a Magazine
- 2001 – You & I
- 2000 – It's Automatic

Non-Album Single

- 1997 – Chasing Cities

== Remixography ==
Year	Artist	Song	Length
1999	Akasha feat. Maxi Jazz	"Maximum Karma" (Sloop John Barillo Remix)	4:29
2000	Leroy Hanghofer	"Pin" (Jacques Lu Cont and Sloop John Barillo Mix)	6:21
2001	Zoot Woman	"It's Automatic" (Paper Faces Mix)	5:54
2001	Zoot Woman	"Living in a Magazine" (Paper Faces Mix)	7:15
2002	Themroc	"Gold Is Your Metal" (Paper Faces Mix)	
2003	Zoot Woman	"Grey Day" (Paper Faces Mix)	7:11
2003	Zoot Woman	"Gem" (Paper Faces Mix)	7:47
2003	Scissor Sisters	"Comfortably Numb" (Paper Faces Mix)	8:25
2004	Scissor Sisters	"Laura" (Paper Faces Remix)	7:49
2005	Scissor Sisters	"Filthy/Gorgeous" (Paper Faces Full Length Mix)	8:53
2005	Scissor Sisters	"Filthy/Gorgeous" (Paper Faces Vocal Edit)	4:33
2005	Chromeo	"Needy Girl" (Paper Faces Mix)	7:17
2005	Felix da Housecat	"Ready 2 Wear" (Paper Faces Mix)	7:31
2006	Scissor Sisters	"I Don't Feel Like Dancin'" (Paper Faces Mix)	6:35
2006	Madonna	"Let It Will Be" (Paper Faces Vocal Edit)	5:24
2006	Madonna	"Let It Will Be" (Paper Faces Mix)	7:28
2006	Armand Van Helden	"Sugar" (Paper Faces Dub)	6:36
2006	Armand Van Helden	"Sugar" (Paper Faces Remix)	6:37
2008	Frankmusik	"3 Little Words" (Paper Faces Remix)	7:16
2009	Felix da Housecat	"We All Wanna Be Prince" (Paper Faces Remix)	6:39
2012	Phoebe Killdeer and the Short Straws	"Scholar" (Mad March Hare Remix)	3:27
