= 2005 in Swiss music =

In 2005, Swiss music began to chart climb significantly. Audiences saw many chart debuts from both Swiss and international acts and saw two novelty songs share a combined total of over ten weeks at the singles chart number one spot. Internationally, the Swiss also saw Vanilla Ninja take the country to their best Eurovision Song Contest position in twelve years.

== Chart summary ==
The first Swiss Top 100 Singles Chart number one of 2005 was "Living to Love You" by Sarah Connor. The single was Connor's second Swiss number one and had entered the chart back in November 2004. However, a slump in sales following the rush for Christmas number one had allowed Connor to climb from No. 2 and take the accolade. The first album chart number one of the year was Robbie Williams' Greatest Hits.

Nu Pagadi's "Sweetest Poison" replaced Sarah Connor at the number one spot on January 9, having entered at No. 5 the week before. January 9 saw no new entries in the Top 55 of the singles chart, with the highest being Global Deejays' post-Christmas offering at No. 56.

The MusicStars, a collaboration of participants from the reality television series of the same name, achieved the first of two number ones on January 30 with "Friends Forever". Meanwhile, in the album chart, Green Day made number one with American Idiot.

February 6 saw Schnappi's "Schnappi, das kleine Krokodil" climb to number one. The single featured a young German child singing about a small crocodile. The music video accompanying the song also featured a small crocodile on an adventure around the world. The single was immensely popular through its novelty value, and after making it to number one would stay there for another month.

February also saw number-one albums from Lovebugs and DJ Bobo, the latter having had huge success across Europe since the mid-1990s. Schnappi lost the top spot in the singles chart on March 13 to the MusicStars 'he' had taken it from, only to take it back the following week. The run at number one finally ended on April 10, after eight weeks total at the top spot. 50 Cent and Olivia's "Candy Shop" took over the spot, having a similarly long six-week run at number one.

Unlike the singles chart, the album chart had been a revolving door throughout March and early April, with several artists making number one, only to drop down the chart a week later. On April 17 DJ Antoine's The Black Album made number one. The album would stay there for two weeks and was Antoine's fifth top-ten album.

Salome Clausen dethroned 50 Cent on May 15. The MusicStars contestant's debut single "Gumpu" would be the song to do it, staying at number one until June 5, when the internationally successful Akon's "Lonely" took the spot off her. Including the MusicStars releases, Salome had already been, by the end of the first half of 2005, at number one three times.

Meanwhile, on May 21, Vanilla Ninja represented Switzerland at the Eurovision Song Contest 2005. The group comfortably made it through the May 19 semi-finals, and eventually finished 8th in the contest, despite leading at several points during the competition. The girl group had before the contest had success across Central Europe, having been born in Estonia. The 8th place was a huge boost for Switzerland in the Eurovision, with it becoming their best place since 1993 (see ESC1993). The song the girls performed, "Cool Vibes", was released on June 12. Despite the publicity of competing in the contest and the controversy of not being Swiss and having a member who had just turned 16 (Triinu Kivilaan), the single only made it to a peak of No. 17 in the charts.

Although Bruce Springsteen's Devils and Dust brought some stability to the top of the album chart throughout May, the Top 100 Albums still continued to be quicker-changing than the Top 100 Singles. June saw Gorillaz, The Black Eyed Peas, Gotthard and eventually Coldplay make number one in the album chart. Only the latter, however, would stay there for more than one week. X&Y entered on June 26, and remained at number one until August 7 – A seven-week run not bettered at any time in 2005.

Akon lost the number one spot after his third week at number one, dropping it to the second chart-topping novelty act of the year, the Crazy Frog. Unlike Schnappi, the Crazy Frog had already been made well-known (but not necessarily popular) by its being sold as a ringtone. The single, "Axel F" (a cover of Harold Faltermeyer's 1985 hit), was the debut of the frog and easily passed Akon on July 3. This overtaking move (the Crazy Frog had entered on May 29 at #28) started a run of eleven weeks at number one, ending on September 18. Meanwhile, in the album chart, James Blunt replaced Coldplay at number one on August 14 with his debut Back To Bedlam album.

September 18 saw the first time since June that both the singles and album chart number ones changed simultaneously. Juanes replaced the Crazy Frog in the singles chart, and the Rolling Stones' A Bigger Bang replaced James Blunt in the album chart. Both lasted two weeks at the top of their respective charts, the Pussycat Dolls and Busta Rhymes' "Don't Cha" taking the Top 100 Singles top spot on October 2.

The Pussycat Dolls had already achieved success in the USA, and their debut single also achieved huge popularity in Switzerland. Their run at number one lasted until November when Melanie C replaced them. Meanwhile, in the album chart, the group Patent Ochsner enjoyed a three-week run in an otherwise inconsistent Autumn of 2005 for the album chart.

The hugely successful Madonna unsurprisingly made number one on November 20, with the release of her return single "Hung Up". A week later she replaced Eros Ramazzotti at the album chart top spot with Confessions on a Dance Floor. Although the album only lasted two weeks at number one, Madonna would see out the remainder of 2005 at the singles top spot, with there being little competition for Christmas number one. In fact, the highest new entry on December 25 was Robbie Williams' "Advertising Space", entering outside of the Top Ten at No. 11.

Robbie Williams would gain the Christmas Album Top 100 number one, though, with his album Intensive Care topping the chart for a second week.

== Other events in 2005 ==
- In December 2005, the Swiss national broadcaster announced that Six4one will represent the country at the Eurovision Song Contest 2006. Six4one was put together for the sole purpose of representing Switzerland and was expected to disband afterward. The six individuals in the group were chosen at a casting session in November, and included Andreas Lundstedt (of Alcazar fame), Tinka (famous Balkan opera singer and TV celebrity), Liel (branded the "next Celine Dion") and Claudia D'Addio (the only Swiss member of the group, and a participant in the MusicStars show).
- On December 16, 2005, the official website of the Swiss charts, Hitparade.ch, celebrated its tenth birthday. The site had been started in 1995 by Steffen Hung and had eventually grown to be so popular that the official charts company adopted it as the official site of the Swiss music industry. Hitparade celebrated the milestone with several competitions and special birthday branding on its website.

== Swiss charts ==
Week Starting	Top 100 Singles #1		Top 100 Albums #1		Top 100 Singles Highest N.E.
January 2	Sarah Connor	"Living To Love You"	Robbie Williams	Greatest Hits	Nu Pagadi	"Sweetest Poison" (#5)
January 9	Nu Pagadi	"Sweetest Poison"	Robbie Williams	Greatest Hits	Global Deejays	"The Sound of San Francisco" (#56)
January 16	Nu Pagadi	"Sweetest Poison"	Robbie Williams	Greatest Hits	Iron Maiden	"The Number of the Beast" (#42)
January 23	Nu Pagadi	"Sweetest Poison"	Robbie Williams	Greatest Hits	Green Day	"Boulevard of Broken Dreams" (#28)
January 30	MusicStars	"Friends Forever"	Green Day	American Idiot	MusicStars	"Friends Forever" (#1)
February 6	Schnappi	"Schnappi, Das Kleine Krokodil"	Lovebugs	Naked	Eminem	"Like Toy Soldiers" (#5)
February 13	Schnappi	"Schnappi, Das Kleine Krokodil"	DJ Bobo	Pirates Of Dance	Mustafa Sandal ft. Gentleman	"Isyankar" (#9)
February 20	Schnappi	"Schnappi, Das Kleine Krokodil"	DJ Bobo	Pirates Of Dance	Nelly ft. Tim McGraw	"Over And Over" (#10)
February 27	Schnappi	"Schnappi, Das Kleine Krokodil"	Green Day	American Idiot	Jennifer Lopez	"Get Right" (#3)
March 6	Schnappi	"Schnappi, Das Kleine Krokodil"	Green Day	American Idiot	The Game ft. 50 Cent	"How We Do" (#3)
March 13	MusicStars	"Here I Am"	Jennifer Lopez	Rebirth	MusicStars	"Here I Am" (#1)
March 20	Schnappi	"Schnappi, Das Kleine Krokodil"	Les Enfoirés	Le train des Enfoirés	Sarah Connor	"From Zero To Hero" (#10)
March 27	Schnappi	"Schnappi, Das Kleine Krokodil"	Moby	Hotel	50 Cent ft. Olivia	"Candy Shop" (#6)
April 3	Schnappi	"Schnappi, Das Kleine Krokodil"	Nena	Willst Du Mit Mir Gehn	Mario	"Let Me Love You" (#3)
April 10	50 Cent ft. Olivia	"Candy Shop"	Nena	Willst Du Mit Mir Gehn	The Killers	"Somebody Told Me" (#16)
April 17	50 Cent ft. Olivia	"Candy Shop"	DJ Antoine	The Black Album	DJ Bobo	"Amazing Life" (#27)
April 24	50 Cent ft. Olivia	"Candy Shop"	DJ Antoine	The Black Album	Natalie Imbruglia	"Shiver" (#36)
May 1	50 Cent ft. Olivia	"Candy Shop"	DJ Tatana	Peace And Love	Daddy Yankee	"Gasolina" (#12)
May 8	50 Cent ft. Olivia	"Candy Shop"	Bruce Springsteen	Devils and Dust	Gotthard	"Lift U Up" (#3)
May 15	Salome Clausen	"Gumpu"	Bruce Springsteen	Devils and Dust	Akon	"Lonely" (#5)
May 22	Salome Clausen	"Gumpu"	Bruce Springsteen	Devils and Dust	Gorillaz	"Feel Good Inc." (#12)
May 29	Salome Clausen	"Gumpu"	System of a Down	Mezmerize	Shakira ft. Alejandro Sanz	"La Tortura" (#4)
June 5	Akon	"Lonely"	Gorillaz	Demon Days	Tupac Shakur ft. Elton John	"Ghetto Gospel" (#12)
June 12	Akon	"Lonely"	The Black Eyed Peas	Monkey Business	Backstreet Boys	"Incomplete" (#3)
June 19	Akon	"Lonely"	Gotthard	Lipservice	Gwen Stefani	"Hollaback Girl" (#18)
June 26	Akon	"Lonely"	Coldplay	X&Y	50 Cent	"Just A Lil' Bit" (#11)
July 3	Crazy Frog	"Axel F"	Coldplay	X&Y	DJ Energy ft. Gotthard	"Lift U Up (Theme Of Energy '05)" (#17)
July 10	Crazy Frog	"Axel F"	Coldplay	X&Y	Mariah Carey	"We Belong Together" (#13)
July 17	Crazy Frog	"Axel F"	Coldplay	X&Y	Ben Moody ft. Anastacia	"Everything Burns" (#14)
July 24	Crazy Frog	"Axel F"	Coldplay	X&Y	DJ Tomekk ft. Fler and G-Hot	"Jump Jump (DJ Tomekk Kommt)" (#25)
July 31	Crazy Frog	"Axel F"	Coldplay	X&Y	Ilona Mitrecey	"C'Est Le Vacances" (#9)
August 7	Crazy Frog	"Axel F"	Coldplay	X&Y	Kandlbauer	"Maybe in Heaven" (#3)
August 14	Crazy Frog	"Axel F"	James Blunt	Back To Bedlam	Ciara ft. Ludacris	"Oh" (#19)
August 21	Crazy Frog	"Axel F"	James Blunt	Back To Bedlam	James Blunt	"You're Beautiful" (#4)
August 28	Crazy Frog	"Axel F"	James Blunt	Back To Bedlam	Stress	"Libéré" (#6)
September 4	Crazy Frog	"Axel F"	Kandlbauer	Home	Britney Spears	"Someday (I Will Understand)" (#8)
September 11	Crazy Frog	"Axel F"	James Blunt	Back To Bedlam	Rihanna	"Pon De Replay" (#8)
September 18	Juanes	"La Camisa Negra"	Rolling Stones	A Bigger Bang	Pussycat Dolls ft. Busta Rhymes	"Don't Cha" (#6)
September 25	Juanes	"La Camisa Negra"	Rolling Stones	A Bigger Bang	Sean Paul	"We Be Burnin'" (#9)
October 2	Pussycat Dolls ft. Busta Rhymes	"Don't Cha"	Bon Jovi	Have a Nice Day	50 Cent ft. Mobb Deep	"Outta Control" (#14)
October 9	Pussycat Dolls ft. Busta Rhymes	"Don't Cha"	Patent Ochsner	Liebi, Tod und Tüüfu	Star Academy 5	"Je Ne Suis Pas Un Héros" (#20)
October 16	Pussycat Dolls ft. Busta Rhymes	"Don't Cha"	Patent Ochsner	Liebi, Tod und Tüüfu	Robbie Williams	"Tripping" (#2)
October 23	Pussycat Dolls ft. Busta Rhymes	"Don't Cha"	Patent Ochsner	Liebi, Tod und Tüüfu	Rammstein	"Benzin" (#15)
October 30	Pussycat Dolls ft. Busta Rhymes	"Don't Cha"	Depeche Mode	Playing the Angel	US5	"Just Because Of You" (#11)
November 6	Melanie C	"First Day of My Life"	Robbie Williams	Intensive Care	R. Kelly ft. Wisin and Yandell	"Burn It Up" (#25)
November 13	Melanie C	"First Day of My Life"	Eros Ramazzotti	Calma Apparente	Crazy Frog	"Popcorn" (#13)
November 20	Madonna	"Hung Up"	Eros Ramazzotti	Calma Apparente	Madonna	"Hung Up" (#1)
November 27	Madonna	"Hung Up"	Madonna	Confessions on a Dance Floor	K-Maro ft. Shy'm	"Histoires De Luv" (#15)
December 4	Madonna	"Hung Up"	Madonna	Confessions on a Dance Floor	The Black Eyed Peas	"My Humps" (#9)
December 11	Madonna	"Hung Up"	Xavier Naidoo	Telegramm Für X	Sarah Connor	"Christmas in My Heart" (#8)
December 18	Madonna	"Hung Up"	Robbie Williams	Intensive Care	Rihanna	"If It's Lovin' That You Want" (#25)
December 25	Madonna	"Hung Up"	Robbie Williams	Intensive Care	Robbie Williams	"Advertising Space" (#11)

== See also ==
- 2005 in music
- 2005 in British music
- 2005 in Irish music
- 2005 in Norwegian music
- 2005 in South Korean music
- 2005 in country music
- 2005 in classical music
- 2005 in heavy metal music
- 2005 in hip hop music
- 2005 in jazz
- 2005 in Latin music
- 2005 in Switzerland
- Vanilla Ninja
