= List of number-one singles of the 2000s (Switzerland) =

This is a list of singles that reached number one on the Swiss Hitparade from the years 2000 to 2009 by week each reached the top of the chart.

== Number-one singles ==
Key
†	Number-one single of the year

Issue date	Song	Artist	Weeks at number one
2000
13 February	"Sex Bomb"	Tom Jones and Mousse T	4
12 March	"American Pie"	Madonna	3
2 April	"Maria Maria"	Santana featuring The Product G&B	5
7 May	"Oops!... I Did It Again"	Britney Spears	3
28 May	"It's My Life"	Bon Jovi	1
4 June	"Freestyler"†	Bomfunk MC's	10
13 August	"Around the World (La La La La La)"	ATC	2
27 August	"Lucky"	Britney Spears	1
3 September	"Music"	Madonna	5
8 October	"Could I Have This Kiss Forever"	Enrique Iglesias and Whitney Houston	2
22 October	"Lady (Hear Me Tonight)"	Modjo	5
26 November	"Shape of My Heart"	Backstreet Boys	2
10 December	"Lady (Hear Me Tonight)"	Modjo	1
17 December	"Heaven"	Gotthard	2
31 December	"Stan"	Eminem featuring Dido	8
2001
25 February	"Daylight in Your Eyes"	No Angels	6
8 April	"Butterfly"	Crazy Town	6
20 May	"Played-A-Live (The Bongo Song)"	Safri Duo	5
24 June	"Angel"	Shaggy featuring Rayvon	3
15 July	"Lady Marmalade"	Christina Aguilera, Mýa, Lil' Kim, Pink	6
26 August	"Don't Stop Movin'"	S Club 7	2
9 September	"Let Me Blow Ya Mind"	Eve featuring Gwen Stefani	5
14 October	"Only Time"	Enya	3
4 November	"Can't Get You Out of My Head"†	Kylie Minogue	4
2 December	"Hero"	Enrique Iglesias	1
9 December	"M.U.S.I.C."	Tears	2
23 December	"I Believe"	Bro'Sis	3
2002
13 January	"Paid My Dues"	Anastacia	1
20 January	"From Sarah with Love"	Sarah Connor	1
27 January	"Paid My Dues"	Anastacia	1
3 February	"Whenever Wherever"	Shakira	17
2 June	"Without Me"	Eminem	10
11 August	"A Little Less Conversation"	Elvis Presley vs. JXL	1
18 August	"Without Me"	Eminem	1
25 August	"The Ketchup Song (Aserejé)"†	Las Ketchup	11
10 November	"Dilemma"	Nelly featuring Kelly Rowland	5
15 December	"All the Things She Said"	t.A.T.u.	8
2003
9 February	"We Have a Dream"	Deutschland sucht den Superstar	1
16 February	"03 Bonnie and Clyde"	Jay-Z featuring Beyoncé	1
23 February	"Le Frunkp"	Alphonse Brown	2
9 March	"Lose Yourself"	Eminem	1
16 March	"Le Frunkp"	Alphonse Brown	1
23 March	"Lose Yourself"	Eminem	1
30 March	"Take Me Tonight"	Alexander	4
27 April	"American Life"	Madonna	1
4 May	"In da Club"	50 Cent	3
25 May	"Un'emozione per sempre"	Eros Ramazzotti	1
1 June	"Für dich"	Yvonne Catterfeld	3
22 June	"Chihuahua"†	DJ Bobo	7
10 August	"Aïcha"	Outlandish	1
17 August	"Chihuahua"†	DJ Bobo	3
7 September	"Never Leave You (Uh Oooh, Uh Oooh)"	Lumidee	2
21 September	"Where Is the Love?"	The Black Eyed Peas	9
23 November	"Schick mir 'nen Engel"	Overground	4
21 December	"Shut Up"	The Black Eyed Peas	11
2004
7 March	"A Kiss Goodbye"	MusicStars	3
28 March	"Left Outside Alone"	Anastacia	1
4 April	"In Love with You Again"	Carmen Fenk	1
11 April	"Yeah"	Usher	6
23 May	"Fuck It (I Don't Want You Back)"	Eamon	4
20 June	"Dragostea din tei"†	O-Zone	14
26 September	"Femme Like U (Donne-moi ton corps)"	K-Maro	1
3 October	"Obsesión"	Aventura	1
10 October	"Femme Like U (Donne-moi ton corps)"	K-Maro	5
14 November	"Just Lose It"	Eminem	2
28 November	"Lose My Breath"	Destiny's Child	5
2005
2 January	"Living to Love You"	Sarah Connor	1
9 January	"Sweetest Poison"	Nu Pagadi	3
30 January	"Friends Forever"	MusicStars	1
6 February	"Schnappi, das kleine Krokodil"†	Schnappi	5
13 March	"Here I Am"	MusicStars	1
20 March	"Schnappi, das kleine Krokodil"†	Schnappi	3
10 April	"Candy Shop"	50 Cent featuring Olivia	5
15 May	"Gumpu"	Salome	3
5 June	"Lonely"	Akon	4
3 July	"Axel F"	Crazy Frog	11
18 September	"La camisa negra"	Juanes	2
2 October	"Don't Cha"	The Pussycat Dolls featuring Busta Rhymes	5
6 November	"First Day of My Life"	Melanie C	2
20 November	"Hung Up"	Madonna	7
2006
8 January	"Big City Life"	Mattafix	5
12 February	"I Belong to You (il ritmo della passione)"	Eros Ramazzotti and Anastacia	6
26 March	"Because of You"	Kelly Clarkson	2
9 April	"I Still Burn"	Tobias Regner	2
23 April	"Because of You"	Kelly Clarkson	1
30 April	"Hips Don't Lie"†	Shakira featuring Wyclef Jean	7
18 June	"Crazy"	Gnarls Barkley	1
25 June	"Bring en hei"	Baschi	3
16 July	"Crazy"	Gnarls Barkley	5
20 August	"Unfaithful"	Rihanna	4
17 September	"Rudebox"	Robbie Williams	1
24 September	"Unfaithful"	Rihanna	6
5 November	"I Don't Feel Like Dancin'"	Scissor Sisters	2
19 November	"The Saints Are Coming"	U2 and Green Day	1
26 November	"Hurt"	Christina Aguilera	1
3 December	"Patience"	Take That	2
17 December	"Shame"	Monrose	2
31 December	"All Good Things (Come to an End)"	Nelly Furtado	11
2007
18 March	"Say It Right"	Nelly Furtado	1
25 March	"Qué Hiciste"	Jennifer Lopez	1
1 April	"Say It Right"	Nelly Furtado	1
8 April	"Qué Hiciste"	Jennifer Lopez	1
15 April	"Say It Right"	Nelly Furtado	2
29 April	"Beautiful Liar"	Beyoncé and Shakira	4
27 May	"Now or Never"	Mark Medlock	2
10 June	"Umbrella"	Rihanna featuring Jay-Z	9
12 August	"Hot Summer"	Monrose	2
26 August	"Vayamos compañeros"	Marquess	1
2 September	"1973"	James Blunt	8
28 October	"Don't Stop the Music"	Rihanna	2
11 November	"No One"	Alicia Keys	1
18 November	"Don't Stop the Music"	Rihanna	3
9 December	"Apologize"† (2008)	Timbaland presents OneRepublic	7
2008
27 January	"My Man Is a Mean Man"	Stefanie Heinzmann	2
10 February	"Bleeding Love"	Leona Lewis	8
6 April	"Mercy"	Duffy	3
27 April	"4 Minutes"	Madonna featuring Justin Timberlake	6
8 June	"Love Is You"	Thomas Godoj	1
15 June	"Bring en hei"	Baschi	3
6 July	"All Summer Long"	Kid Rock	7
24 August	"I Kissed a Girl"	Katy Perry	7
12 October	"So What"	Pink	4
9 November	"I ha di gärn"	Gölä	1
16 November	"Das Feyr vo dr Sehnsucht"	Jodlerklub Wiesenberg and Francine Jordi	8
2009
11 January	"Hot n Cold"	Katy Perry	5
15 February	"Broken Strings"	James Morrison featuring Nelly Furtado	3
8 March	"Irgendwas bleibt"	Silbermond	1
15 March	"Poker Face"†	Lady Gaga	8
10 May	"Ayo Technology"	Milow	3
31 May	"Anything but Love"	Daniel Schuhmacher	1
7 June	"Ayo Technology"	Milow	3
28 June	"Stahn Uf"	Baschi, Bligg, Ritschi, Seven and Stress	1
5 July	"When Love Takes Over"	David Guetta featuring Kelly Rowland	8
30 August	"I Gotta Feeling"	The Black Eyed Peas	8
25 October	"Bodies"	Robbie Williams	5
29 November	"Monday Morning"	Melanie Fiona	6

== See also ==
- 2000s in music
