= Moji =

Moji may refer to:

- Onji or hyōon moji (表音文字), phonic characters used in counting beats in Japanese poetry
- Moji-ku, Kitakyūshū, ward (district) of the city of Kitakyūshū, Fukuoka Prefecture, Japan
  - Moji Station in that ward, Kyushu Railway Company station on the Kagoshima and Sanyō Main Lines
  - Siege of Moji (1561)
- ...Moji, 2005 debut album by Swiss singer Salome
- Moji language, Loloish language spoken by the Phula people of Yunnan in southwestern China
- Moji (TV network), a national television network in Indonesia

People with the name Moji include:

- Moji Akinfenwa (fl. 1990s and 2000s), Nigerian politician from Osun State
- Mosese Rauluni (born 1975), Fijian rugby union player nicknamed Moji

== See also ==
- Emoji
- Mochi (disambiguation)
- Moji-Mirim, municipality in São Paulo state, Brazil
- Moji das Cruzes, alternative spelling for the municipality of Mogi das Cruzes in São Paulo state, Brazil
- Mojibake, unreadable characters caused by text encoding problems
