= Apologize (song) =

2006 single by OneRepublic

Single by OneRepublic

from the album Dreaming Out Loud
- Released: April 30, 2006
- Recorded: 2006
- Genre: Pop rock; soft rock
- Length: 3:28
- Label: Mosley; Interscope
- Songwriter: Ryan Tedder
- Producers: Ryan Tedder; Greg Wells

OneRepublic singles chronology
"Apologize" (2006)	"Stop and Stare" (2007)

Audio sample
- file; help

"Apologize"

Single by Timbaland featuring OneRepublic

from the album Shock Value
- B-side: "Give It to Me (Laugh at Em) (Remix)"
- Released: September 11, 2007
- Recorded: 2006
- Genre: Pop; R&B
- Length: 3:04
- Label: Mosley; Interscope
- Songwriters: Timothy Mosley; Ryan Tedder
- Producers: Timbaland; Ryan Tedder; Greg Wells

Timbaland singles chronology
"The Way I Are" (2007)	"Apologize" (2007)	"Scream" (2007)

Music video
- "Apologize" on YouTube

"Apologize" is a song written by Ryan Tedder, which first appeared on Timbaland's second studio album Shock Value (2007). It was then released as the third single from that album (fourth in Australia), along with the original recording by OneRepublic. It accordingly also served as the debut single for OneRepublic's debut album Dreaming Out Loud (2007), produced by Greg Wells. Timbaland's version omits the guitar solo after the second verse in the original, and includes an extra line of percussion, new backing vocals, and added sound samples, in addition to sound mixing and a few other minor changes. The song was the biggest radio airplay hit in the history of the Mainstream Top 40 chart in the United States, with 10,394 plays in one week, until its record was broken by Leona Lewis's "Bleeding Love", which was also co-written by Tedder. The song was a major hit internationally, reaching number one in 16 countries, including Australia, Austria, Canada, Germany, Italy, New Zealand, Sweden, Turkey, and the Netherlands, as well as staying at number one for eight consecutive weeks on the Billboard Pop 100 chart. The song peaked at number two on the Billboard Hot 100, staying in the top-10 for 25 weeks, and spent 13 weeks at number one in Canada.

"Apologize" earned the band a Grammy Award nomination for Best Pop Performance by a Duo or Group with Vocals and was ranked number 50 on the list of the Billboard Hot 100's All-Time Top Songs list from the chart's first 50 years. It spent 25 consecutive weeks in the top 10, the longest stay there for any song since "Smooth" by Santana featuring Rob Thomas, which spent 30 weeks in the top ten from 1999 to 2000. It was also ranked number 10 on Billboard's Hot 100 Songs of the Decade.

== Music video ==
The music video for the original version of "Apologize" was created by filmmaker Aaron Platt in 2006, after the band had asked fans on Myspace to make one. It begins with Tedder writing the word "apologize" on a parchment letter with a needlepoint pen. What follows is interspersed footage of various different things, including: a woman reading the letter, Tedder singing the song while on the end of a handset, ink blots, the rest of the band performing and glass smashing.

An official video associated with the remix was filmed on September 19, 2007, and released in early October. The video premiered on VH1's Top 20 Countdown on October 27, 2007. The video was directed by Robert Hales and was shot in a recording studio showing OneRepublic performing the song. It also includes scenes from a New Year's Eve countdown party, starring actor Brian A. Pollack. In a third version of the video, also directed by Robert Hales and associated with the remix, Timbaland is portrayed remixing the song himself. A European version of the video features clips of the film Keinohrhasen, starring Til Schweiger. A Japanese version of the video was also made available for a short time. It features the same footage as the original but has more scenes from different camera angles. It also features footage of people falling and floating in the air in slow motion. The music video currently has 948 million views.

== Chart performance ==
"Apologize" was OneRepublic's breakout hit. In the United States, "Apologize" peaked at number two on the Billboard Hot 100 for four non-consecutive weeks. It spent 11 weeks at number three and 25 weeks inside the top 10 and peaked at number three for 10 weeks on the Hot 100 Airplay. It also topped the Billboard Pop 100 and became the third single from Shock Value to have topped the chart. It also became the album's first number-one single on the Billboard Adult Top 40. It is also the second consecutive single from Shock Value to reach number one on the US Mainstream Top 40 radio. It became only the tenth song to sell over 5 million by May 2011 in the US. As of February 2014, it had sold 5,819,000 copies. In late 2009, the song was ranked in tenth place on the Billboard Hot 100 Decade-End chart, making it the highest-ranking song and the only top-10 ranking song on there to not top the weekly Billboard Hot 100 chart.

In the UK, "Apologize" climbed to number 32 on the strength of digital downloads alone, and peaked at number three. The song spent 28 consecutive weeks in the top 40 and 13 weeks in the top 10. The song ended 2007 as the year's sixteenth biggest selling single in Britain. In Australia, the single debuted at number 10 on the ARIA Singles Chart, and peaked at number one. It stayed at the top for eight consecutive weeks, and was certified 4× Platinum by ARIA. The song reached number one on both the Canadian Hot 100 and New Zealand RIANZ Chart. It is the most downloaded single of all time in Australia and New Zealand. On Billboard's official European Hot 100 Singles chart, the song debuted at number 16, making it the highest debut chart position of any new act in the history of the chart. It later entered the top 10. The song went gold in Russia with 100,000 copies sold.

In Germany, the song was downloaded 437,000 times, making it the third best-selling download single of all time behind Lady Gaga's "Poker Face" and Lena Meyer-Landrut's "Satellite".

== Track listing ==
- European CD single
1. "Apologize" (Timbaland presents OneRepublic) — 3:04
2. "Apologize" (OneRepublic version) — 3:25
- European enhanced CD single
1. "Apologize" (Timbaland presents OneRepublic) — 3:04
2. "Apologize" (OneRepublic version) — 3:25
3. "The Way I Are" (OneRepublic remix) — 3:31
4. "Apologize" (video)
- UK CD single
1. "Apologize" (Album) — 3:04
2. "Give It to Me (Laugh at Em)" (remix featuring Justin Timberlake and Jay-Z) [radio edit] — 3:16
- UK 12" single
1. "Apologize" (Album) — 3:04
2. "Apologize" (Instrumental) — 3:04
3. "Give It to Me (Laugh at Em)" (remix featuring Justin Timberlake and Jay-Z) [explicit] — 3:20
4. "Give It to Me (Laugh at Em)" (remix instrumental) — 3:17

== Personnel ==
- Ryan Tedder – lead vocals, background vocals, piano
- Zach Filkins – lead guitar, viola, backing vocals
- Drew Brown – keyboards, rhythm guitar, glockenspiel
- Eddie Fisher – drums, percussion
- Brent Kutzle – cello, bass

== Covers ==
- Australian musician Natalie Gauci sang the song in the finale episode of the fifth season of Australian Idol in 2007.
- Luke Bryan covered "Apologize" on Doin' My Thing.
- Kris Allen covered "Apologize" on the eighth season of American Idol.
- Dutch symphonic metal band Within Temptation covered the song as part of their weekly radio promos for their 15-year anniversary show, Elements. The song is also featured on their cover album The Q-Music Sessions.
- Swedish alternative metal band All Ends covered the song on their album All Ends.
- Canadian post-hardcore band Silverstein covered the song on the Punk Goes Pop 2 compilation album.
- On February 2, 2010, Soomo Publishing uploaded a parody version of this song, titled "Too Late to Apologize: A Declaration" to YouTube, which has more than 14 million views as of February 21, 2025.
- Actor and singer Willam released a parody cover in 2013 titled "RuPaulogize" where she discussed her experiences and disqualification on the fourth season of RuPaul's Drag Race. The season winner Sharon Needles plays RuPaul.
- Female country singer Kacey Musgraves and Pixie Lott have also covered "Apologize".
- Taylor Swift covered this song on the Speak Now World Tour as a mashup with her songs “Back to December” and “You’re Not Sorry”.

== Charts ==
=== Weekly charts ===
Chart (2007–2008)	Peak position
Australia (ARIA)	1
Australian Urban (ARIA)	1
Austria (Ö3 Austria Top 40)	1
Belgium (Ultratop 50 Flanders)	2
Belgium (Ultratop 50 Wallonia)	2
Canada Hot 100 (Billboard)	1
Canada AC (Billboard)	2
Canada CHR/Top 40 (Billboard)	1
Canada Hot AC (Billboard)	1
CIS Airplay (TopHit)	1
Croatia Airplay (Top lista)	3
Czech Republic Airplay (ČNS IFPI)	2
Denmark (Tracklisten)	2
European Hot 100 Singles (Billboard)	1
Finland (Suomen virallinen lista)	4
France (SNEP)	7
Germany (GfK)	1
Germany (Airplay Chart)	1
Hungary (Rádiós Top 40)	1
Hungary (Dance Top 40)	29
Ireland (IRMA)	2
Italy (FIMI)	1
Latvia (Latvian Airplay Top 50)	1
Lithuania (EHR)	1
Netherlands (Dutch Top 40)	1
Netherlands (Single Top 100)	2
New Zealand (Recorded Music NZ)	1
Norway (VG-lista)	2
Poland (Airplay Chart)	1
Portugal Digital Songs (Billboard)	1
Russia Airplay (TopHit)	1
Scottish Singles Sales (Official Charts)	6
Slovakia Airplay (ČNS IFPI)	1
Sweden (Sverigetopplistan)	1
Switzerland (Schweizer Hitparade)	1
Turkey (Billboard)	1
Ukraine Airplay (TopHit)	1
UK Singles (Official Charts)	3
US Billboard Hot 100	2
US Adult Contemporary (Billboard)	4
US Adult Pop Airplay (Billboard)	1
US Dance Club Songs (Billboard)	35
US Hot R&B/Hip-Hop Songs (Billboard)	60
US Pop Airplay (Billboard)	1
US Rhythmic Airplay (Billboard)	5

2009 weekly chart performance for "Apologize"
Chart (2009)	Peak position
CIS Airplay (TopHit)	180
Russia Airplay (TopHit)	173
Ukraine Airplay (TopHit)	119

2010 weekly chart performance for "Apologize"
Chart (2010)	Peak position
CIS Airplay (TopHit)	91
Russia Airplay (TopHit)	89
Ukraine Airplay (TopHit)	91

2011 weekly chart performance for "Apologize"
Chart (2011)	Peak position
CIS Airplay (TopHit)	182
Ukraine Airplay (TopHit)	83

2012 weekly chart performance for "Apologize"
Chart (2012)	Peak position
Ukraine Airplay (TopHit)	121

2013 weekly chart performance for "Apologize"
Chart (2013)	Peak position
Ukraine Airplay (TopHit)	108

2014 weekly chart performance for "Apologize"
Chart (2014)	Peak position
Ukraine Airplay (TopHit)	31

2015 weekly chart performance for "Apologize"
Chart (2015)	Peak position
Ukraine Airplay (TopHit)	87

2020 weekly chart performance for "Apologize"
Chart (2020)	Peak position
Ukraine Airplay (TopHit)	150

2022 weekly chart performance for "Apologize"
Chart (2022)	Peak position
Ukraine Airplay (TopHit)	108

2023 weekly chart performance for "Apologize"
Chart (2023)	Peak position
Estonia Airplay (TopHit)	145
Romania Airplay (TopHit)	142

2024 weekly chart performance for "Apologize"
Chart (2024)	Peak position
Estonia Airplay (TopHit)	79
Moldova Airplay (TopHit)	43

2025 weekly chart performance for "Apologize"
Chart (2025)	Peak position
Estonia Airplay (TopHit)	155
Portugal (AFP)	198

2026 weekly chart performance for "Apologize"
Chart (2026)	Peak position
Luxembourg (Billboard)	15

=== Monthly charts ===
2007 monthly chart performance for "Apologize"
Chart (2007)	Peak position
CIS Airplay (TopHit)	5
Russia Airplay (TopHit)	5
Ukraine Airplay (TopHit)	6

2008 monthly chart performance for "Apologize"
Chart (2008)	Peak position
CIS Airplay (TopHit)	1
Russia Airplay (TopHit)	1
Ukraine Airplay (TopHit)	13

2014 monthly chart performance for "Apologize"
Chart (2014)	Peak position
Ukraine Airplay (TopHit)	93

=== Year-end charts ===
Chart (2007)	Position
Australia (ARIA)	6
Austria (Ö3 Austria Top 75)	32
CIS Airplay (TopHit)	106
European Hot 100 Singles (Billboard)	48
Germany (Media Control GfK)	32
Ireland (IRMA)	9
Netherlands (Dutch Top 40)	80
New Zealand (RIANZ)	9
Russia Airplay (TopHit)	111
Sweden (Sverigetopplistan)	12
Switzerland (Schweizer Hitparade)	12
Ukraine Airplay (TopHit)	140
UK Singles (OCC)	16
US Billboard Hot 100	66

Chart (2008)	Position
Australia (ARIA)	32
Austria (Ö3 Austria Top 75)	2
Belgium (Ultratop 50 Flanders)	12
Belgium (Ultratop 40 Wallonia)	5
Brazil (Crowley)	11
Canada (Canadian Hot 100)	1
Canada AC (Billboard)	3
Canada CHR/Top 40 (Billboard)	14
Canada Hot AC (Billboard)	12
CIS Airplay (TopHit)	6
European Hot 100 Singles (Billboard)	1
France (SNEP)	46
Germany (Media Control GfK)	1
Hungary (Rádiós Top 40)	5
Italy (FIMI)	8
Netherlands (Dutch Top 40)	21
Netherlands (Single Top 100)	41
Russia Airplay (TopHit)	7
Spain (PROMUSICAE)	36
Sweden (Sverigetopplistan)	29
Switzerland (Schweizer Hitparade)	1
Ukraine Airplay (TopHit)	10
UK Singles (OCC)	54
US Billboard Hot 100	5
US Adult Contemporary (Billboard)	3
US Adult Top 40 (Billboard)	9
US Mainstream Top 40 (Billboard)	4
US Rhythmic Airplay (Billboard)	24

2010 year-end chart performance for "Apologize"
Chart (2010)	Position
Ukraine Airplay (TopHit)	153

2011 year-end chart performance for "Apologize"
Chart (2011)	Position
Ukraine Airplay (TopHit)	179

2024 year-end chart performance for "Apologize"
Chart (2024)	Position
Estonia Airplay (TopHit)	177

=== Decade-end charts ===
2000s decade-end chart performance for "Apologize"
Chart (2000–2009)	Position
Australia (ARIA)	25
Austria (Ö3 Austria Top 75)	30
CIS Airplay (TopHit)	10
Germany (Media Control Charts)	4
Russia Airplay (TopHit)	13
Ukraine Airplay (TopHit)	52
UK Singles (Official Charts Company)	90
US Billboard Hot 100	10
US Mainstream Top 40 (Billboard)	1

20s Decade-end chart performance for "Apologize"
Chart (2020–2025)	Position
Estonia Airplay (TopHit)	106

=== All-time charts ===
Chart	Position
US Billboard Hot 100	64
US Mainstream Top 40 (Billboard)	4

== Certifications and sales ==
Region	Certification	Certified units/sales
Australia (ARIA)	11× Platinum	770,000^{‡}
Austria (IFPI Austria)	2× Platinum	60,000^{*}
Belgium (BRMA)	Gold	
Brazil (Pro-Música Brasil)	3× Platinum	180,000^{‡}
Canada (Music Canada)	5× Platinum	400,000^{‡}
Denmark (IFPI Danmark)	3× Platinum	270,000^{‡}
Germany (BVMI)	9× Gold	1,350,000^{‡}
Italy	—	100,000
Italy (FIMI) since 2010	2× Platinum	200,000^{‡}
New Zealand (RMNZ)	4× Platinum	120,000^{‡}
Portugal (AFP)	3× Platinum	75,000^{‡}
Spain (Promusicae)	Platinum	60,000^{‡}
Sweden (GLF)	2× Platinum	40,000^{^}
Switzerland (IFPI Switzerland)	3× Platinum	90,000^{^}
United Kingdom (BPI)	3× Platinum	1,800,000^{‡}
United States (RIAA)	5× Platinum	5,819,000
United States (RIAA) Mastertone	Platinum	1,000,000^{*}
Summaries
Worldwide	—	20,000,000
^{*} Sales figures based on certification alone.^{^} Shipments figures based on certification alone.^{‡} Sales+streaming figures based on certification alone.

== Release history ==
Release dates and formats for "Apologize"
Region	Date	Format	Label	Ref.
United States	September 11, 2007	Contemporary hit radio	Interscope	
United States	October 16, 2007	Digital download	Interscope	
United Kingdom	October 29, 2007	CD single	Polydor	
Germany	November 9, 2007	CD single; enhanced CD single	Universal	
Australia	November 19, 2007	CD single	Universal	

== See also ==
- List of Dutch Top 40 number-one singles of 2007
- List of European number-one hits of 2007
- List of highest-certified singles in Australia
- List of Hot 100 number-one singles of 2007 (Canada)
- List of number-one hits of 2007 (Austria)
- List of number-one hits of 2007 (Germany)
- List of number-one hits of 2007 (Sweden)
- List of number-one hits of 2007 (Switzerland)
- List of number-one hits of 2008 (Italy)
- List of number-one singles from the 2000s (New Zealand)
- List of number-one singles in Australia in 2007
