= Say (All I Need) =

Single by OneRepublic

from the album Dreaming Out Loud
- Released: June 2, 2008
- Recorded: 2007
- Genre: Pop rock
- Length: 3:50
- Label: Mosley; Interscope
- Songwriters: Ryan Tedder; Zach Filkins; Drew Brown; Eddie Fisher; Brent Kutzle
- Producers: Greg Wells; Andrew Prickett

OneRepublic singles chronology
"Stop and Stare" (2007)	"Say (All I Need)" (2008)	"Mercy" (2008)

"Say (All I Need)" is a song by American pop rock band OneRepublic. It is the third single released from their debut album Dreaming Out Loud (2007) and follows the global success of their previous top ten singles, "Apologize" and "Stop and Stare". Lead singer Ryan Tedder has commented that "Say (All I Need)" is his "favorite track on the album." All five members of the band, Tedder, Zach Filkins, Drew Brown, Eddie Fisher and Brent Kutzle share writing and composing credits on the song. The single was released in the UK on June 2, 2008 and features their Live Lounge cover of Duffy's single "Mercy". "Say (All I Need)" was released on June 24, 2008 in the United States.

The song was recorded at Rocket Carousel Studios in Culver City by producer Greg Wells and engineer Drew Pearson. The chorus of the song was featured during the most recent season of The Hills. Also it featured in the pilot episode of the TV series, The Vampire Diaries. On July 3, 2008, OneRepublic made a guest appearance on So You Think You Can Dance (U.S. season 4) for a live performance of "Say (All I Need)". In France, the song was recorded as a duet with the French R&B singer Sheryfa Luna and was renamed as Say (À l'infini).

== Meaning ==
The song is about a relationship that appears to be in danger or is dying. Drummer Eddie Fisher said, "There is a saying that broken hearts write the best love songs."

== Track listing ==
- German and UK CD single
1. "Say (All I Need)" (album version) — 3:51
2. "Mercy" (Radio 1 Live Lounge session) (Duffy cover) — 3:43
- German CD single
1. "Say (All I Need)" (album version) — 3:51
2. "Mercy" (Radio 1] Live Lounge session) (Duffy cover) — 3:43
3. "Say (All I Need)" (live) — 4:04
4. "Say (All I Need)" (video)
- Digital download (French duet version)
1. "Say (À l'infini)" (French duet version) featuring Sheryfa Luna — 3:54
2. "Say (All I Need)" — 3:50

== Music video ==
The official music video for "Say (All I Need)" was filmed in Paris, France and directed by Anthony Mandler. Filmed partially in black and white, the video begins with the sound of church bells waking up Ryan Tedder. He dons a jacket and grabs a small black journal and leaves the house. As he leaves the house he passes by Chris Cornell, who makes a cameo appearance. The music begins and we see Tedder walking and sometimes running throughout the city near such famous Paris landmarks as the Sacre Coeur, seemingly in search of something, while the other members of the band are seen in different locations throughout the city. Drew Brown is seen riding a Vespa scooter and Zach Filkins, Eddie Fisher, and Brent Kutzle have individual close-ups on a bridge and walking down some graffiti covered alleys. The band is also seen performing the song in an ex-meat abattoir in Paris, now artists apartments. As the music swells and begins to climax, Tedder races through the city, enters a building and climbs a winding staircase to the top. Reaching the top, he steps out onto a rooftop with a breathtaking view of the city at sunset. He then takes the small black journal from his pocket and writes, "just say," ending the music video.

Tedder has given this explanation for the meaning of the song, "This song is about being happy with what you have in life, and not obsessing over what you don't have. Whether it's a person or relationship, love, or success, or even fame." "We wanted to make a piece of art and do something beautiful and inspiring," said Tedder.

== Chart performance ==
Months before the single's official release, "Say (All I Need)" had already started appearing on the charts relying on downloads alone. Its first appearance was in November, (shortly after Dreaming Out Loud was released) on Billboard's Hot Digital Songs, debuting at number seventy-five. It dropped out a few weeks after. The song made its way up the UK charts and a few other European charts, after its official release. The song was released to radio in the US in the third week of June 2008.

Chart (2007–2008)	Peak position
Canada Hot 100 (Billboard)	75
Czech Republic Airplay (ČNS IFPI)	30
Germany (GfK)	41
Netherlands (Dutch Top 40)	32
Romania (Romanian Top 100)	81
UK Singles (Official Charts)	51
US Digital Song Sales (Billboard)	57

== Certifications ==
Region	Certification	Certified units/sales
United States (RIAA)	Gold	500,000^{‡}
^{‡} Sales+streaming figures based on certification alone.

== Release history ==
Release dates and formats for "Say (All I Need)"
Region	Date	Format	Label	Ref.
United Kingdom	June 2, 2008	CD	Polydor	
United States	June 24, 2008	Contemporary hit radio	Interscope	
Australia	July 21, 2008	CD	Universal	
Germany	August 8, 2008	CD	Universal	
