= Love Runs Out =

2014 single by OneRepublic

Single by OneRepublic

from the album Native
- Released: April 14, 2014
- Recorded: 2012–2013
- Studio: Studio Faust Records (Prague); Studio Le Roy (Amsterdam); Motorbass Studio (Paris); Metropolis Studio (London); Tritonus Studio (Berlin)
- Genre: Dance-pop; pop rock
- Length: 3:44
- Label: Mosley; Interscope
- Songwriters: Ryan Tedder; Brent Kutzle; Drew Brown; Zach Filkins; Eddie Fisher
- Producer: Ryan Tedder

OneRepublic singles chronology
"Something I Need" (2013)	"Love Runs Out" (2014)	"I Lived" (2014)

Music video
- "Love Runs Out" by OneRepublic on YouTube

"Love Runs Out" is a song recorded by American pop rock band OneRepublic for the 2014 reissue of their third studio album Native (2013). The song was produced by frontman Ryan Tedder, who co-wrote it with bandmates Brent Kutzle, Drew Brown, Zach Filkins, and Eddie Fisher. "Love Runs Out" was digitally released in Australia on April 14, 2014, and was serviced to contemporary hit radio in the United States on May 6 as the fourth overall single from the album.

== Background and composition ==
"Love Runs Out" was originally intended to be the first single from Native, but was eventually passed over in favour of "If I Lose Myself". Tedder told Capital FM, "We have a new single that's not even on the album that's about to drop. I can't quote the date," and "I wanted ["Love Runs Out"] to be the first single, a few of us in the band did, but I could not finish the chorus. And you can't have a song without a chorus."

Sheet music for "Love Runs Out" shows the key of G minor with a moderate tempo of 120 beats per minute. The vocals span from D_{3} to D_{5} in the song.

== Critical reception ==
The song received positive reviews from music critics. 4Music called "Love Runs Out" a "spine-tingling track" with "slick production" and a "stomper".

== Commercial performance ==
"Love Runs Out" debuted at number 81 on the Billboard Hot 100 and at number 22 on the New Zealand Singles Chart. The song eventually reached a peak of number 15 on the Hot 100. It reached its million sales mark in the US in August 2014 and by the end of 2014 had sold 1.4 million copies.

The song charted even higher in other countries. It reached the top 5 in Austria, Luxembourg, Canada, Germany and the UK, as well as the top 10 in Spain and South Africa. Its success in Germany was tied to the fact that the TV station ZDF had selected it as its official anthem for the 2014 FIFA World Cup.

== Music video ==
A music video was produced for the song and was directed by Sophie Muller. It cost the group $180,000. The video has references to Sade's video "Soldier of Love", also under Muller's direction. As of December 2025, it has over 206 million views on YouTube and is OneRepublic's fifth most viewed music video.

== In other media ==
"Love Runs Out" is one of the official theme songs for WWE's WrestleMania 35 event in 2019. It was also included in the video game NBA 2K15, the soundtrack of which curated by Pharrell Williams.

== Track listing ==
- Digital download
1. "Love Runs Out" – 3:44
- CD single
1. "Love Runs Out" – 3:44
2. "Counting Stars" (Mico C remix edit) – 3:18
- Digital download – Remixes
1. "Love Runs Out" (Passion Pit Remix) – 5:00
2. "Love Runs Out" (Grabbitz Remix) – 3:19
3. "Love Runs Out" (Disciples Remix) – 4:59

== Credits and personnel ==
Credits adapted from the liner notes of Native.

Locations

- Recorded at Studio Faust Records, Prague, Czech Republic; Studio Le Roy Amsterdam, Netherlands; Motorbass Studio, Paris, France; Metropolis Studio London, United Kingdom; Tritonus Studio Berlin, Germany
- Mixed at MixStar Studios, Virginia Beach, Virginia

Personnel

- Songwriting – Ryan Tedder, Brent Kutzle, Drew Brown, Zach Filkins, Eddie Fisher
- Production – Ryan Tedder
- Backing vocals – Bobbie Gordon, Brent Kutzle, Zach Filkins
- Bass – Brent Kutzle
- Drums – Eddie Fisher
- Engineer – Gerd Krueger, Luke Oldham, Mikel Le Roy, Ryan Tedder, Benjamin McCulloch, Derek Saxenmeyer, Steve Walsh
- Engineering assistant – Aaron Ahmad, Sam Harper
- Guitar – Drew Brown, Ryan Tedder
- Mixing – Serban Ghenea
- Piano – Ryan Tedder
- Percussion – Zach Filkins
- Additional programming – Ryan Tedder

== Charts ==
=== Weekly charts ===
Weekly chart performance for "Love Runs Out"
Chart (2014–15)	Peak position
Australia (ARIA)	22
Austria (Ö3 Austria Top 40)	3
Belgium (Ultratop 50 Flanders)	33
Belgium (Ultratop 50 Wallonia)	19
Canada Hot 100 (Billboard)	4
Canada AC (Billboard)	4
Canada CHR/Top 40 (Billboard)	8
Canada Hot AC (Billboard)	2
Czech Republic Airplay (ČNS IFPI)	5
Czech Republic Singles Digital (ČNS IFPI)	19
Denmark (Tracklisten)	13
France (SNEP)	76
Germany (GfK)	3
Hungary (Rádiós Top 40)	5
Hungary (Single Top 40)	3
Ireland (IRMA)	14
Israel International Airplay (Media Forest)	4
Italy (FIMI)	17
Luxembourg (Billboard)	2
Mexico Anglo (Monitor Latino)	18
Netherlands (Dutch Top 40)	29
Netherlands (Single Top 100)	56
New Zealand (Recorded Music NZ)	20
Poland Airplay (ZPAV)	5
Romania (Airplay 100)	58
Scottish Singles Sales (Official Charts)	1
Slovakia Airplay (ČNS IFPI)	31
Slovakia Singles Digital (ČNS IFPI)	19
Slovenia (SloTop50)	4
Spain (Promusicae)	10
South Africa Airplay (EMA)	8
Sweden (Sverigetopplistan)	31
Switzerland (Schweizer Hitparade)	3
UK Singles (Official Charts)	3
US Billboard Hot 100	15
US Adult Contemporary (Billboard)	15
US Adult Pop Airplay (Billboard)	4
US Pop Airplay (Billboard)	9
US Rock & Alternative Airplay (Billboard)	48

=== Year-end charts ===
Annual chart rankings for "Love Runs Out"
Chart (2014)	Position
Austria (Ö3 Austria Top 40)	28
Canada (Canadian Hot 100)	28
Germany (Official German Charts)	10
Hungary (Rádiós Top 40)	61
Hungary (Single Top 40)	39
Italy (FIMI)	69
Poland (ZPAV)	27
Slovenia (SloTop50)	26
Switzerland (Schweizer Hitparade)	29
UK Singles (Official Charts Company)	77
US Billboard Hot 100	67
US Adult Alternative Songs (Billboard)	31
US Adult Contemporary (Billboard)	39
US Adult Top 40 (Billboard)	12

== Certifications ==
Region	Certification	Certified units/sales
Australia (ARIA)	2× Platinum	140,000^{‡}
Austria (IFPI Austria)	Platinum	30,000^{*}
Brazil (Pro-Música Brasil)	Gold	30,000^{‡}
Canada (Music Canada)	Platinum	80,000^{*}
Germany (BVMI)	Platinum	300,000^{‡}
Italy (FIMI)	Platinum	30,000^{‡}
New Zealand (RMNZ)	Platinum	15,000^{*}
Spain (Promusicae)	Gold	30,000^{‡}
Sweden (GLF)	Platinum	40,000^{‡}
Switzerland (IFPI Switzerland)	Platinum	30,000^{‡}
United Kingdom (BPI)	Platinum	600,000^{‡}
United States (RIAA)	3× Platinum	3,000,000^{‡}
Streaming
Denmark (IFPI Danmark)	Gold	1,300,000^{†}
^{*} Sales figures based on certification alone.^{‡} Sales+streaming figures based on certification alone.^{†} Streaming-only figures based on certification alone.

== Release history ==
Country	Date	Format	Label
Australia	April 15, 2014	Digital download	Mosley Music Group; Interscope Records
Austria	April 15, 2014	Digital download	Mosley Music Group; Interscope Records
Netherlands	April 15, 2014	Digital download	Mosley Music Group; Interscope Records
Switzerland	April 15, 2014	Digital download	Mosley Music Group; Interscope Records
United States	May 5, 2014	Adult album alternative radio	Mosley Music Group; Interscope Records
United States	May 6, 2014	Contemporary hit radio	Mosley Music Group; Interscope Records
Germany	June 6, 2014	Digital download	Mosley Music Group; Interscope Records
Ireland	July 25, 2014	Digital download	Mosley Music Group; Interscope Records
United Kingdom	August 3, 2014	Digital download	Mosley Music Group; Interscope Records
