= Popstars – Jetzt oder nie! =

- Created by: Jonathan Dowling
- Starring: Nu Pagadi; Detlef "D!" Soost; Sandy Mölling
- Opening theme: "Leb' deinen Traum"
- Country of origin: Germany
- No. of episodes: 13

Production
- Camera setup: Multi-camera
- Running time: 100 minutes

Original release
- Network: ProSieben
- Release: 15 September – 8 December 2004

Related
- Popstars – Das Duell; Popstars – Neue Engel braucht das Land

Jetzt oder nie! ("Now or Never!") was the fourth season of the German reality television show Popstars, broadcast in 2004 on ProSieben. The winning band was Nu Pagadi. The contest was judged by Sandy Mölling, Lukas Hilbert and Uwe Fahrenkrog-Petersen.

== Acts ==
Female	Male	Elimination broadcast on
Kristina Dörfer	Patrick Boinet	
Doreen Steinert	Markus Grimm	
Katrin Feist	Richard Mantarliev	8 December 2004
Kristina Neuwert	Stefan	1 December 2004

The contestant became part of the winning band Nu Pagadi.
The contestant made it to the final six.
