= Kristina Dörfer =

German singer and actress (born 1984)

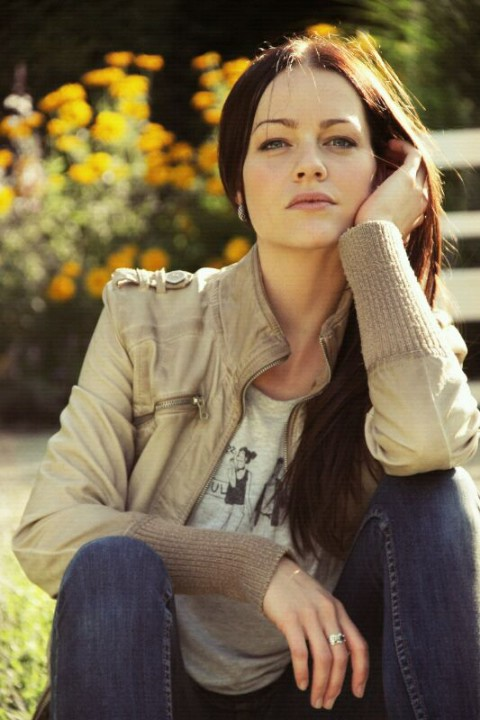
- Dörfer in 2012
- Born: 26 July 1984 (age 40); Wurzen, East Germany
- Occupation(s): Singer, actress
- Years active: 2002–present

Kristina Dörfer (born 26 July 1984), also known by the stage name KR!S or Kris, is a German singer and television actress.

== Biography ==
Born in Wurzen, East Germany, Dörfer was the older of two children. She and her younger brother grew up with their mother in Wurzen until she was 18 years old. Dörfer learned to play the violin at primary school. She performed as a singer for the first time when she was 10 years old in her hometown, and after that she was hired for various events in the region.

In 2002, she reached the "Top 20" at RTL II for the show Teenstar. In the same year, she was presented with the Bravo Award for the project 1000 Schulen in Bewegung. The presentation was in Europa-Park and had an audience of 10.000.

In 2003, Dörfer was a candidate in the RTL show Deutschland sucht den Superstar, which was the German edition of Pop Idol, reaching the "Top 50" stage.

After moving to the Ruhr Area, Dörfer started her professional singing career in two bands in the Dortmund area in parallel. With the Soulsukkers, she sang soul music, and with Soundset, a cover band, she sang rock and pop music.

The following year, Dörfer was selected by ProSieben for the Popstars – Jetzt oder nie! program, and on 8 December 2004 was chosen as a member of the band created by the series, Nu Pagadi. The first single of the band, "Sweetest Poison" reached number one in the German charts. The first album, Your Dark Side, reached number one in the German charts for one week. The band broke up in September 2005, nine months after being formed.

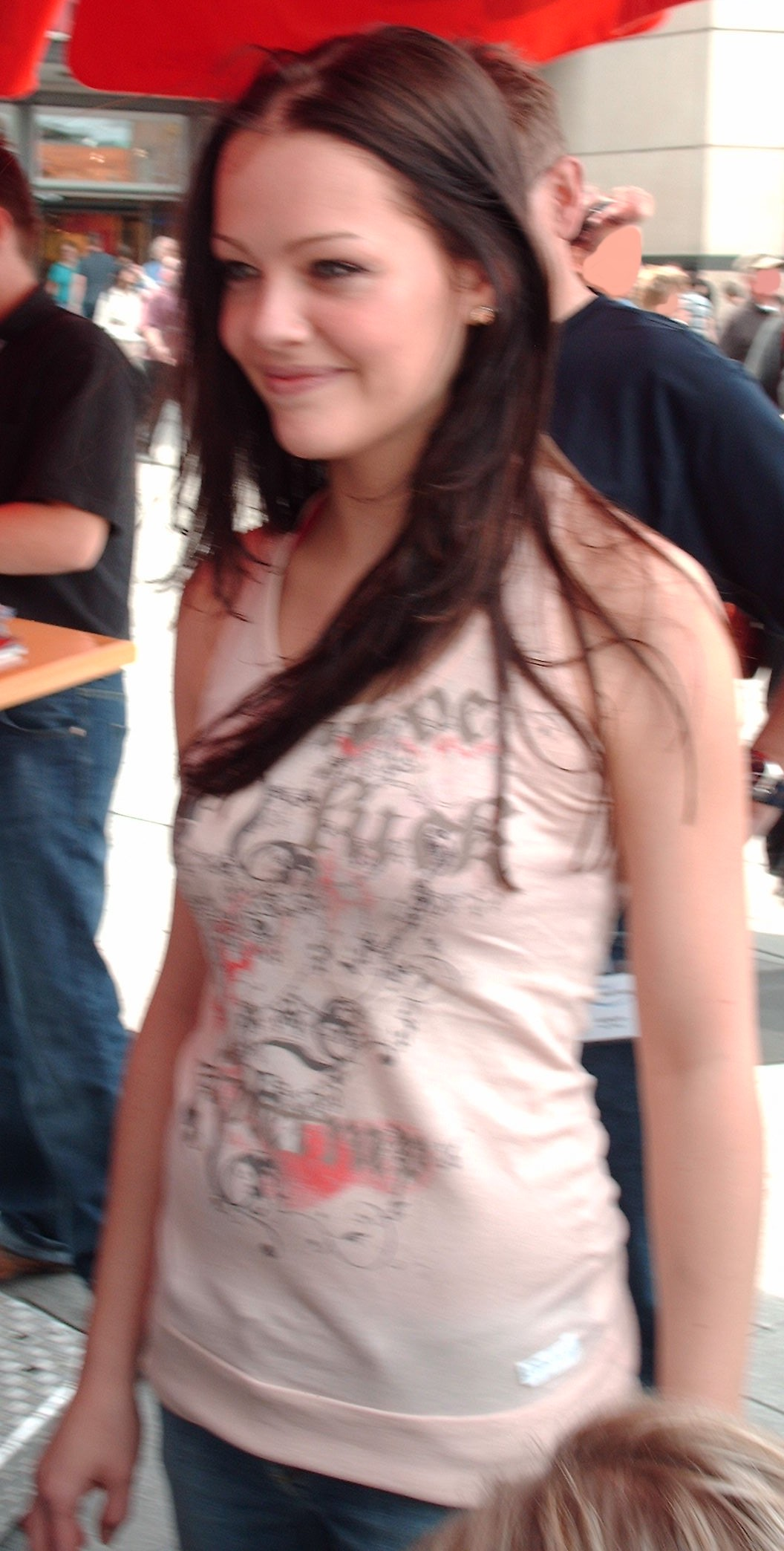
Dörfer in 2007

Dörfer, who had moved to Munich at the beginning of 2005, started a solo career from October 2005. She was given a contract by Edel Music. After appearing in concerts in various countries in Europe, her first single, "Room for More", was released in October 2006. The single reached number 10 in the charts in Finland and number 51 in the Czech Republic. Škoda used the song for advertising the Roomster model.

She played Olivia Schneider in the ARD series Verbotene Liebe from December 2006 to September 2009.

In 2008, she was a member of the casting jury for the musical Frühlings Erwachen, the German language edition of Spring Awakening. In 2010, she and Joscha Kiefer (her former co-worker on "Verbotene Liebe") had a daughter. Her second daughter was born in April 2013.

== Discography ==
=== Singles ===
- 2006: "Room for More"

CZ: 51 – 44/2006 – 1 week
FI: 10 – 42/2006 – 2 weeks

== Filmography ==
- 2006–2009: Verbotene Liebe (Olivia Schneider)
