= Stop and Stare =

Single by OneRepublic

from the album Dreaming Out Loud
- B-side: "Hearing Voices"; "Something's Not Right Here"
- Released: November 27, 2007
- Recorded: 2007
- Genre: Pop rock, arena rock
- Length: 3:44
- Label: Mosley; Interscope
- Songwriters: Ryan Tedder; Zach Filkins; Andrew Brown; Eddie Fisher; Tim Myers
- Producer: Greg Wells

OneRepublic singles chronology
"Apologize" (2006)	"Stop and Stare" (2007)	"Say (All I Need)" (2008)

Audio sample
- file; help

"Stop and Stare" is the second single by American band OneRepublic from their debut album, Dreaming Out Loud (2007). reaching number one as well following up on the global success of the previous top ten single "Apologize". "Stop and Stare" was released on March 3, 2008, in the United Kingdom. It has currently sold over two million digital downloads worldwide.

The song starts off with an acoustic guitar riff accompanied by a ringing electric guitar background fill. Both continue throughout the entire song. The song gradually builds up, with bass and drums coming in, as the song approaches the pre-chorus, before erupting into an emotional chorus led by lead singer Ryan Tedder's vocals and carried along by the full band. The song climaxes at the bridge, with Tedder's falsetto and an electric guitar tremolo background. In live versions, guitarist Drew Brown plays a tremolo guitar solo during the bridge portion instead of the original recording.

== Critical reception ==
Nick Levine of Digital Spy described the song as "a big, muscular rock ballad, very much in the Matchbox 20 mould, steered by a vein-poppingly emotional vocal from lead singer Ryan Tedder".

== Music video ==
The official music video for "Stop and Stare" premiered on MTV's TRL on January 28, 2008. The video was directed by Anthony Mandler.

The video was filmed in the desert of Palmdale, California, at an old gas station/motel. Throughout the video, flashes are shown with multiple versions of the band members Ryan Tedder, Zach Filkins, Eddie Fisher, Brent Kutzle, and Drew Brown. As the video begins, Ryan is walking through the desert toward an open grave where a preacher stands delivering a eulogy. As he walks, scenes are flashed showing Ryan completely submerged in a bathtub while fully clothed, in motel room #7 staring at a television displaying static, ringing the service bell at the motel desk, and sitting and waiting in the motel lobby. More Ryans are seen wandering around the motel, and again in motel room #7 leaning against the wall listening, while yet another Ryan is seen frantically driving a car with a pregnant woman in the back seat about to give birth. The Ryan standing at the open grave splits into two Ryans with one Ryan staying at the grave appearing to pray, while the other Ryan walks back towards the motel.

At one point, the rest of the band in motel room #13 performs the song and Ryan enters the room and joins them. Outside the motel, people from all walks of life have been gathering. Among them are Ryan, Zach, Eddie, Brent and Drew. They are all just standing outside the motel, staring. Many of these scenes repeat and continue to flash back and forth, culminating in a scene in which the Ryan driving the car comes to a screeching halt, almost hitting the Ryan walking towards the motel as he crosses the road and the gathering of "staring" people look on unmoved.

The static TV then bursts into flames, the Ryan in the bathtub emerges from the water, the preacher is alone at the open grave (with Ryan not there, concluding that the Ryan standing at the grave was the one who died) and the video ends.

== Chart performance ==
"Stop and Stare" became the band's second top twenty hit in the US, reaching number twelve on the Hot 100 and number nine on the Pop 100, but climbing as high as number two on the US adult airplay chart. Its video also reached number one on the VH1 Top 20 Video Countdown. The song has reached the top twenty in Australia and New Zealand, peaking at number eleven in both countries on the singles chart, and reaching number one on the airplay chart. It has reached the top twenty in most of Europe. In the United Kingdom, the song debuted at number eleven on the singles chart and the following week, it reached number nine on the UK Singles Chart, still on downloads alone. Upon physical release, "Stop and Stare" has peaked at number four on the chart, earning OneRepublic their second top five hit in Britain. In Ireland, the song debuted at number eight due to high downloads and reached number two on the airplay chart. In Germany, the song was rewarded the highest debut upon entering the chart at number seven in its first week, peaking at number six. The song has held steady at number four on the Billboard European Hot 100.

== Track listing ==
- UK CD single
1. "Stop and Stare" — 3:44
2. "Hearing Voices" — 4:01
- German and Australian CD single
1. "Stop and Stare" — 3:43
2. "Something's Not Right Here" — 3:02
- German enhanced CD single
1. "Stop and Stare" — 3:43
2. "Something's Not Right Here" — 3:02
3. "Hearing Voices" — 4:01
4. "Stop and Stare" (video)
- Digital download (Hit 3 Pack)
1. "Stop and Stare" — 3:43
2. "Last Goodbye" (Stripped Live Mix) — 4:31
3. "Too Easy" — 3:14

== Charts ==
=== Weekly charts ===
Chart (2007–09)	Peak position
Australia (ARIA)	11
Austria (Ö3 Austria Top 40)	5
Belgium (Ultratop 50 Flanders)	29
Belgium (Ultratip Bubbling Under Wallonia)	2
Canada Hot 100 (Billboard)	16
Canada AC (Billboard)	28
Canada CHR/Top 40 (Billboard)	20
Canada Hot AC (Billboard)	4
Czech Republic Airplay (ČNS IFPI)	2
Denmark (Tracklisten)	7
Europe (Eurochart Hot 100)	4
France (SNEP)	29
Germany (GfK)	6
Germany Airplay (BVMI)	1
Hungary (Editors' Choice Top 40)	7
Ireland (IRMA)	5
Italy (FIMI)	13
Netherlands (Dutch Top 40)	18
Netherlands (Single Top 100)	46
New Zealand (Recorded Music NZ)	11
Norway (VG-lista)	15
Poland (Polish Airplay Charts)	2
Romania (Romanian Top 100)	19
Scottish Singles Sales (Official Charts)	6
Slovakia Airplay (ČNS IFPI)	14
Spain (Spanish Airplay Charts)	8
Sweden (Sverigetopplistan)	10
Switzerland (Schweizer Hitparade)	8
UK Singles (Official Charts)	4
US Billboard Hot 100	12
US Adult Alternative Airplay (Billboard)	19
US Adult Contemporary (Billboard)	19
US Adult Pop Airplay (Billboard)	2
US Pop Airplay (Billboard)	6
Venezuela Pop Rock (Record Report)	3

=== Year-end charts ===
Chart (2008)	Position
Australia (ARIA)	59
Austria (Ö3 Austria Top 40)	31
Canada (Canadian Hot 100)	29
Canada Hot AC (Billboard)	8
Europe (Eurochart Hot 100)	36
Germany (Media Control GfK)	40
Russia Airplay (TopHit)	196
Switzerland (Schweizer Hitparade)	43
UK Singles (OCC)	40
US Billboard Hot 100	33
US Adult Top 40 (Billboard)	12
US Mainstream Top 40 (Billboard)	19

== Certifications ==
Region	Certification	Certified units/sales
Australia (ARIA)	2× Platinum	140,000^{‡}
Denmark (IFPI Danmark)	Platinum	15,000^{^}
Germany (BVMI)	Gold	150,000^{‡}
New Zealand (RMNZ)	Platinum	30,000^{‡}
United Kingdom (BPI)	Gold	400,000^{‡}
United States (RIAA)	4× Platinum	4,000,000^{‡}
^{^} Shipments figures based on certification alone.^{‡} Sales+streaming figures based on certification alone.

== Release history ==
Release dates and formats for "Stop and Stare"
Region	Date	Format	Label	Ref.
United States	November 27, 2007	Contemporary hit radio	Interscope	
Australia	February 18, 2008	CD single	Universal	
United Kingdom	March 3, 2008	CD single	Polydor	
Germany	March 14, 2008	Enhanced CD single	Universal	
Germany	March 21, 2008	CD single	Universal	
