= Colorado Springs Christian Schools =

Private Christian school in Colorado, United States

Colorado Springs Christian School

Location
- 4855 Mallow Road; Colorado Springs, Colorado; United States; 38°53′51″N 104°48′41″W

Information
- Type: Private Christian school
- Motto: Excellent Education. Biblical Perspective. Lifelong Service.
- Established: 1972 (54 years ago)
- CEEB code: 060269
- Faculty: 48.5
- Grades: Pre-k to 12th grade
- Colors: Navy and gold
- Athletics conference: Tri-Peaks League
- Mascot: Lions
- Accreditation: ACSI
- Website: www.cscslions.org

Colorado Springs Christian Schools is a private pre-k through 12th grade Christian school system in the cities of Colorado Springs, Colorado and Woodland Park, Colorado. Its "Colorado Springs Campus" is at 4855 Mallow Road, and its "Woodland Park Campus" is at 1003 Tamarac Parkway. It has two middle schools and includes Colorado Springs Christian High School.

It was founded in 1971.

According to its superintendent, Roland DeRenzo, it "starts from the reference point of people being biologically male or female".

The Woodland Park campus was opened in 2005 as a K-5th grade school, and added 6th, 7th, and 8th grade levels successively in 2019, 2020, and 2021.

== Notable alumni ==
- Zach Filkins, lead guitarist of the band OneRepublic
- Ryan Tedder, lead vocalist of OneRepublic
