= Dreaming Out Loud =

Studio album by OneRepublic
- Released: November 20, 2007
- Recorded: 2004 – June 2007
- Genres: Alternative rock; pop rock; pop; R&B
- Length: 53:04
- Labels: Mosley; Interscope
- Producers: Greg Wells; Timbaland (exec.); Ryan Tedder

OneRepublic chronology
Dreaming Out Loud (2007)	Waking Up (2009)

Singles from Dreaming Out Loud
- 1. "Apologize" Released: April 30, 2006; 2. "Stop and Stare" Released: November 27, 2007; 3. "Say (All I Need)" Released: June 2, 2008; 4. "Mercy" Released: September 8, 2008; 5. "Come Home" Released: July 14, 2009

Dreaming Out Loud is the debut studio album by the American pop rock band OneRepublic. The album was released on November 20, 2007, by Interscope Records. The album was recorded between 2004 and 2007 and it was produced by Greg Wells, with two songs produced by OneRepublic’s lead singer Ryan Tedder, and was engineered and mixed by Joe Zook. The album followed two years of massive success on Myspace; the band had appeared in Myspace Music's Top Artists since early 2006, with over 28 million total song plays counted.

The album was released after the success of a remix version of the lead single "Apologize", which was produced by Timbaland. The song reached number one in many countries, while it peaked at number 2 on the Billboard Hot 100 chart. The following single "Stop and Stare" was also a success, while "Say (All I Need)", "Mercy" and "Come Home" were also released as singles.

The album received generally mixed to negative reviews from music critics. Many critics cited U2, Coldplay, The Fray, Muse and Snow Patrol as the band's influences on the album and commended the band for having a "tremendous confidence apparent in the craft of creating pleasing music", but others felt it was an unoriginal album and thought that Tedder continued to make pop rock far better whenever he was writing for groups other than his own, and also noted that it was difficult to distinguish the differences between some tracks and their influences. The album reached top ten in many countries, including the Australian Albums Chart, Canadian Albums Chart, German Albums Chart, UK Albums Chart and others. It debuted at number 14 on the Billboard 200 chart. Dreaming Out Loud has been certified triple Platinum by the RIAA.

== Background ==
OneRepublic were formed in 2003 by Ryan Tedder and his high school classmate Zach Filkins. Although the band was officially formed in Los Angeles, its origins trace back to Colorado, where the two musicians began creating music together. The lineup was later expanded with the addition of fellow Coloradans Drew Brown, Eddie Fisher, and Brent Kutzle. After spending approximately two and a half years developing material in the studio, the band completed their debut album, an alternative rock project that Tedder described as "Jeff Buckley doing Radiohead." While lead single "Sleep" was breaking onto alternative radio, two months before their album was due to be released in the summer of 2006, they were dropped by their label, Columbia Records.

The band was beginning to gain prominence on Myspace, becoming the number-one unsigned act on the site. The song "Apologize" was already released on Myspace the same year and achieved 20,000,000 plays. This led to the band catching the attention of several labels, including Mosley Music Group which was owned by Timbaland. Timbaland liked "Apologize" and created a remixed version of it which appeared on Shock Value in early 2007, and after the song's appearance in a number of American TV dramas, allied with two years of Myspace notoriety, OneRepublic had a number one hit, even without an accompanying album.

== Composition ==
Many critics cited U2, Snow Patrol and The Fray as the band's influences on the album. The album starts out with "Say (All I Need)", which according to Blogcritics is "a U2-sounding song", that is full of soaring heartfelt vocals. It begins with a vocal effect, and leads to an overlooking verse on a girl's soul by Ryan Tedder. With chopped-up, choir-like vocals, Tedder launch a rock ballad that's filled with rising crescendos and interesting musical textures. "Mercy" features an upbeat tempo and is full of hope and promise. "Stop and Stare" is a big, muscular rock ballad, which according to Digital Spy is "very much in the Matchbox 20 mould", steered by a vein-poppingly emotional vocal from lead singer Ryan Tedder. "Apologize" has heart-felt lyrics and is heavy on self-imposed melodrama. It has hip-hop beats mingling with a string section cutting Ryan Tedder's bland vocals with a stuttering R&B drum loop. "Goodbye Apathy" has a chorus that was considered "charmingly harmonious", while Tedder's vocals were considered "U2-sounding". "All Fall Down" begins with an acoustic riff followed by strings that follow the riff, while the verses follows the instruments as well.

The seventh track "Tyrant" crank up the rock guitars, letting a little bit of angst bleed through the band's performance. It begins with a fast piano playing. Tedder enters slowly at first, but picks up speed with a drum beat that enters too. In the song, he sings: "Capable of most anything, this crippled bird's gonna sing". "Prodigal" is a pure ballad that uses guitar riffs and keyboards to back dreamy vocals. "Won’t Stop" is almost an alternative country in its sound. It is a ballad compared to Turin Brakes’ classic The Optimist LP, replete with strings, bells, and harmonized vocals. "All We Are" is a ballad backed by keyboards and reminiscent of The Fray in both sound and style. "Someone to Save You" was considered "a big song, with big vocals and big sound, kind of a ballad on steroids." The somber piano ballad "Come Home" offers a political stance on the war and an appeal to bring the troops home. It is a tribute to American soldiers and was written by Tedder about a soldier friend of his who was serving overseas. The last track is a remixed version of "Apologize" produced and featuring Timbaland. The Timbaland remix has his trademark "yeah" grunts in the background and a slight resequencing of the drum patterns.

== Critical reception ==
Professional ratings
Review scores
Source	Rating
AllMusic	3/5 stars
Digital Spy	2/5 stars
PopMatters	4/10
Robert Christgau	(dud)
Rolling Stone	2/5 stars

Dreaming Out Loud received generally mixed to negative reviews from music critics. Andrew Leahey from AllMusic gave the album 3 out of 5 stars, and noted that "the album still sounded derivative, almost as if it were mimicking the popular trends that Tedder helped create with his production gigs. None of this made Dreaming Out Loud a bad album, particularly, but it did make it an unoriginal one, and Tedder continued to fare better whenever he was writing for groups other than his own." Blogcritics wrote a very positive review, stating that "Dreaming Out Loud is full of hopeful ballads and a couple of rock songs, and reveals OneRepublic's vocal and musical talents."

Evan Sawdey from PopMatters wrote: "Though Greg Wells' high-budget production gives Dreaming Out Loud a professional sheen, the problems start and end with Tedder. His band, his voice, his lyrics—they've all been heard before. What's particularly disappointing is how his songs all just blend together in a strictly melodic sense." Rob Sheffield from Rolling Stone commented: "On the album, OneRepublic get to assert their own identity, which is a drag, since the half-loud guitars and sob-in-the-throat vocals could be absolutely anybody." Nick Levine from Digital Spy called it "a fairly drab, characterless affair." Chris Jones from BBC Music expressed: "It remains an album that will appeal to fans of the OC and those moments when the lovelorn antics of the cast demand some cod-existentialism. It may be pop, but it's a long way from fun.

== Singles ==
The first single to be lifted from the album was "Apologize", both in its original form and a version remixed by Timbaland. The remix helped propel the song to number two on the Billboard Hot 100 in late 2007. Its 25 weeks in the top 10 were the most there since Santana's "Smooth" featuring Rob Thomas spent 30 in 1999. "Apologize" has also sold more than 5.8 million downloads only in the United States. It was a number-one single on Australia, Austria, Canada, Italy, Netherlands, New Zealand, Sweden and Switzerland. It also charted at number 3 on the UK Singles Chart. The follow-up single "Stop and Stare" was released on March 3, 2008, in the United Kingdom. The song was a success on the charts, where it reached number 12 on the Billboard Hot 100, number 4 on the UK Singles Chart and inside the top-ten in Austria, Sweden, Switzerland.

A third single from the album, "Say (All I Need)" was released on June 27, 2008. The song wasn't as successful as the previous singles, only reaching number 51 on the UK Singles Chart and number 75 on the Canadian Hot 100. In September 2008, the band released their fourth single, "Mercy". The official video for "Mercy" debuted in the UK on August 15, 2008, on the music channel 'Q'. The video is filmed in black and white and features OneRepublic performing the song on a beach. However, the song didn't chart on the UK Singles Chart. "Come Home", a digital single, was remastered featuring Sara Bareilles and was released on July 14, 2009, in the iTunes stores and debuted on the Billboard Hot 100 at #80.

=== Media appearances ===
"Apologize" was used in the German film Keinohrhasen (2007) and on Cold Case. "Apologize", alongside "Stop and Stare" and "Mercy", were featured on the seventh season of the American television series Smallville. Also "Stop and Stare" was featured on Castle's pilot episode. "Say (All I Need)" was featured on Ghost Whisperer and The Vampire Diaries. "Come Home" was featured on Cold Case and The Vampire Diaries while "Won't Stop" was featured on The Hills. "All We Are" was used in HBO's 2009 promo. The song "Tyrant" was used in 2010 film The Last Song as the movie's opening song and it was included as the leading track in the official movie soundtrack.

== Track listing ==
All songs are produced by Greg Wells, except where noted.

Standard edition
No.	Title	Writer(s)	Producer(s)	Length
1.	"Say (All I Need)"	Ryan Tedder, Zachary Filkins, Andrew Brown, Brent Kutzle, Eddie Fisher	Wells, Andrew Prickett	3:50
2.	"Mercy"	Tedder, Brown, Jerrod Bettis, Tim Myers (Note: Bettis and Myers are uncredited.)		4:00
3.	"Stop and Stare"	Tedder, Filkins, Brown, Fisher, Myers		3:43
4.	"Apologize"	Tedder		3:28
5.	"Goodbye, Apathy"	Tedder		3:32
6.	"All Fall Down"	Tedder, Filkins, Brown, Kutzle, Fisher		4:04
7.	"Tyrant"	Tedder, Brown, Filkins		5:03
8.	"Prodigal"	Tedder, Jerrod Bettis (Note: Filkins, Brown, and Myers are also credited in the GMR database.)		3:55
9.	"Won't Stop"	Tedder, Filkins, Brown, Kutzle, Fisher	Tedder	5:03
10.	"All We Are"	Tedder, Myers		4:28
11.	"Someone to Save You"	Tedder, Myers, Fisher		4:15
12.	"Come Home"	Tedder	Tedder	4:23
Total length:				49:44

Hidden track
No.	Title	Writer(s)	Producer(s)	Length
13.	"Apologize (remix)"	Tedder	Wells, Tedder, Timbaland	3:05

Target edition
No.	Title	Writer(s)	Producer(s)	Length
14.	"Hearing Voices"	Tedder	Mikel Blue	3:55
15.	"Dreaming Out Loud"	Tedder		4:39

International edition
No.	Title	Writer(s)	Producer(s)	Length
13.	"Dreaming Out Loud"	Tedder		4:39
14.	"Apologize (remix)" (hidden track)	Tedder	Wells, Tedder, Timbaland	3:05

European limited edition
No.	Title	Writer(s)	Producer(s)	Length
15.	"Hearing Voices"	Tedder	Blue	3:55
16.	"Mercy" (Radio 1 Live Lounge) (Duffy cover)	Duffy, Steve Booker	Andy Rogers	3:43

Asian tour edition
No.	Title	Writer(s)	Producer(s)	Length
15.	"Stop and Stare" (Live @ The Orange Lounge)	Tedder, Filkins, Brown, Fisher, Myers		3:28
16.	"Apologize" (Live @ The Orange Lounge)	Tedder		3:02
17.	"Mercy" (Radio 1 Live Lounge) (Duffy cover)	Duffy, Booker	Rodgers	3:43
18.	"Say (All I Need)" (Live)	Tedder, Filkins, Brown, Kutzle, Fisher		4:05

Digital UK Nokia edition
No.	Title	Writer(s)	Producer(s)	Length
13.	"Dreaming Out Loud"	Tedder		4:39
14.	"Something's Not Right Here"	Tedder, Filkins, Brown, Fisher, Myers	Blue	3:02
15.	"Apologize" (remix)	Tedder		3:04
16.	"Apologize" (Live @ SWR3 Radio Session)	Tedder		3:02

Japanese edition
No.	Title	Writer(s)	Producer(s)	Length
13.	"Dreaming Out Loud"	Tedder		4:39
14.	"Something's Not Right Here"	Tedder, Myers, Filkins, Brown, Fisher		3:02
15.	"Hearing Voices"	Tedder		3:55
16.	"Apologize" (remix)	Tedder	Wells, Tedder, Timbaland	3:04
17.	"Stop and Stare" (Live @ The Orange Lounge)	Tedder, Filkins, Brown, Fisher, Myers		3:28
18.	"Apologize" (Live @ The Orange Lounge)	Tedder		3:02
19.	"Say (All I Need)" (Live)	Tedder, Filkins, Brown, Kutzle, Fisher		4:05

International digital extended edition
No.	Title	Writer(s)	Producer(s)	Length
13.	"Dreaming Out Loud"	Tedder		4:39
14.	"Something's Not Right Here" (United Kingdom only)	Tedder, Filkins, Brown, Fisher, Myers	Blue	3:02
15.	"Apologize (remix)"	Tedder	Wells, Tedder, Timbaland	3:04
16.	"Sleep"	Tedder, Bettis		5:54
17.	"Come Home" (featuring Sara Bareilles)	Tedder	Tedder	4:18
18.	"Mercy" (Radio 1 Live Lounge) (Duffy cover)	Duffy, Booker	Rogers	3:43
19.	"All Fall Down" (Live @ The Orange Lounge)	Tedder, Filkins, Brown, Kutzle, Fisher		4:09
20.	"All We Are" (Live @ The Orange Lounge)	Tedder, Myers		4:11

CDPass bonus download
No.	Title	Writer(s)	Length
1.	"Sleep"	Tedder, Bettis	5:56

2016 deluxe edition
No.	Title	Writer(s)	Length
1.	"Apologize" (Live @ The Orange Lounge)	Tedder	3:02
2.	"Stop and Stare" (Live @ The Orange Lounge)	Tedder, Filkins, Brown, Fisher, Myers	3:28
3.	"All Fall Down" (Live @ The Orange Lounge)	Tedder, Filkins, Brown, Kutzle, Fisher	4:09
4.	"All We Are" (Live @ The Orange Lounge)	Tedder, Myers	4:11
5.	"Say (All I Need)" (Live)	Tedder, Filkins, Brown, Kutzle, Fisher	4:05

iTunes Store bonus videos
No.	Title	Writer(s)	Length
1.	"Stop and Stare" (Live video)	Tedder, Filkins, Brown, Fisher, Myers	4:31
2.	"Apologize" (Live video)	Tedder	3:39
3.	"All Fall Down" (Live video)	Tedder, Filkins, Brown, Kutzle, Fisher	4:15

== Personnel ==
All personnel for Dreaming Out Loud adapted from the album's liner notes, except where noted.

=== OneRepublic ===
- Ryan Tedder – lead vocals, piano, guitar; production ("Won't Stop", "Come Home", "Apologize (remix)"); mixing ("Come Home"); engineering ("Won't Stop" and "Come Home")
- Zach Filkins – guitar, backing vocals
- Eddie Fisher – drums, percussion
- Drew Brown – guitar
- Brent Kutzle – bass, cello, backing vocals (1, 6, 7, 9, 10, all live tracks)

=== Additional musicians ===
- Tim Myers – bass and bass arrangement (2–5, 8, 11, "Dreaming Out Loud", "Hearing Voices", "Something's Not Right Here", "Sleep"); songwriting (2, 3, 8, 10, 11, "Something's Not Right Here", "Sleep"); additional bass arrangement (7, 10) (Note: Co-founding member of OneRepublic)
- Andrew DeRoberts – additional slide guitar
- Jerome Harmon – additional keyboards and strings ("Apologize (remix)")
- Sara Bareilles – vocals ("Come Over (single version)")
- David Treahern – programming ("Mercy (radio mix)")
- Luke Potashnik – additional guitar ("Mercy (radio mix)")

=== Production ===
- Greg Wells – production (except "Won't Stop", "Come Home", "Hearing Voices", and "Something's Not Right Here"); additional guitar, keys and beats
- Timbaland – executive production; co-production, programming, additional vocals ("Apologize (remix)")
- Mikel Blue – production ("Hearing Voices" and "Something's Not Right Here")
- Andrew Prickett – additional production ("Say (All I Need)")
- Ash Howes – additional production, mixing ("Mercy (radio mix)")
- Craig Durance – mixing ("Hearing Voices" and "Something's Not Right Here"); engineering ("Won't Stop")
- Joe Zook – mixing (except "Come Home", "Hearing Voices", and "Something's Not Right Here"); engineering (except "Say (All I Need)" and "All Fall Down")
- Drew Peason – engineering ("Say (All I Need)" and "All Falls Down")
- Jonathan Plum – engineering ("Come Home")
- Ari Raskin – engineering ("Come Home")
- Fareed Salamah – engineering ("Apologize (remix)")
- David Treahern – engineering ("Mercy (radio mix)")
- Chris Steffen – additional engineering ("Apologize")
- Andrew Van Meter – production coordinator
- Brian "Big Bass" Gardner – mastering
- Jeremy Cowart – photography
- Jerrod Bettis – album cover & logo design; songwriting (2, 8, "Sleep"); drum arrangement (2, 4, 7, 8, 13, "Sleep")

== Charts ==
=== Weekly charts ===
Weekly chart performance for Dreaming Out Loud
Chart (2007–08)	Peak position
Australian Albums (ARIA)	4
Austrian Albums (Ö3 Austria)	14
Canadian Albums (Billboard)	7
Danish Albums (Hitlisten)	5
Dutch Albums (Album Top 100)	71
European Top 100 Albums (Billboard)	4
French Albums (SNEP)	76
German Albums (Offizielle Top 100)	7
Greek Albums (IFPI)	20
Irish Albums (IRMA)	4
Italian Albums (FIMI)	29
New Zealand Albums (RMNZ)	3
Polish Albums (ZPAV)	32
Scottish Albums (Official Charts)	2
Spanish Albums (Promusicae)	55
Swedish Albums (Sverigetopplistan)	49
Swiss Albums (Schweizer Hitparade)	8
UK Albums (Official Charts)	2
US Billboard 200	14
US Top Alternative Albums (Billboard)	39
US Top Rock Albums (Billboard)	3

=== Year-end charts ===
Year-end chart performance for Dreaming Out Loud
Chart (2008)	Position
Australian Albums (ARIA)	75
Austrian Albums (Ö3 Austria)	50
German Albums (Offizielle Top 100)	29
New Zealand Albums (RMNZ)	31
Swiss Albums (Schweizer Hitparade)	36
UK Albums (OCC)	48
US Billboard 200	44
US Top Rock Albums (Billboard)	12

== Certifications ==
Certifications for Dreaming Out Loud
Region	Certification	Certified units/sales
Australia (ARIA)	Gold	35,000^{^}
Austria (IFPI Austria)	Platinum	20,000^{*}
Canada (Music Canada)	Gold	50,000^{^}
Denmark (IFPI Danmark)	Gold	15,000^{^}
Germany (BVMI)	Platinum	200,000^{^}
Ireland (IRMA)	Platinum	15,000^{^}
New Zealand (RMNZ)	2× Platinum	30,000^{‡}
Russia (NFPF)	Gold	10,000^{*}
Singapore (RIAS)	Gold	5,000^{*}
Switzerland (IFPI Switzerland)	Gold	15,000^{^}
United Kingdom (BPI)	Platinum	308,802
United States (RIAA)	3× Platinum	1,100,000
Summaries
Worldwide	—	2,300,000
^{*} Sales figures based on certification alone.^{^} Shipments figures based on certification alone.^{‡} Sales+streaming figures based on certification alone.

== Release history ==
Release dates and formats for Dreaming Out Loud
Region	Date	Format	Label	Ref.
Canada	November 20, 2007	CD	Universal	
United States	November 20, 2007	CD	Interscope	
Germany	November 30, 2007	CD	Universal	
United Kingdom	March 11, 2008	CD	Polydor	
Japan	July 2, 2008	CD	Universal	
