= Salome Clausen =

Swiss pop music artist

Salome Clausen is a Swiss pop music artist, best known for winning the 2005 second series of the music-based reality television show MusicStars.

== Career ==
Whilst part of MusicStars, Clausen topped the singles chart twice, and be part of three album releases (all of which made the Swiss album top 20). After winning the show, Clausen spent three weeks at the top of the Swiss singles chart with "Gumpu", and saw her debut album ...Moji peak at number two. Clausen has since fallen out of the spotlight, however, and as of 2006, appears to be a one-hit wonder.

In winning MusicStar, Salome beat out competition from talents such as Daniel Kandlbauer and Claudia D'Addio, who have both also had success in their post-MusicStar careers.

== Personal life ==
In 2006, she chose to go back to her former life and now works as a hair stylist.

== Discography ==
=== Singles ===
- "Friends Forever" (2005) (#1, Switzerland) [as part of MusicStars]
- "Here I Am" (2005) (#1, Switzerland) [as part of MusicStars]
- "Gumpu" (2005) (#1, three weeks, Switzerland)

=== Albums ===
- New Generation (2005) (#5, Switzerland) [as part of MusicStars]
- Thank You (2005) (#2, Switzerland) [as part of MusicStars]
- Gold (2005) (#14, Switzerland) [as part of MusicStars]
- ...Moji (2005) (#2, Switzerland)
