= Drew Brown (musician) =

American musician (born 1984)

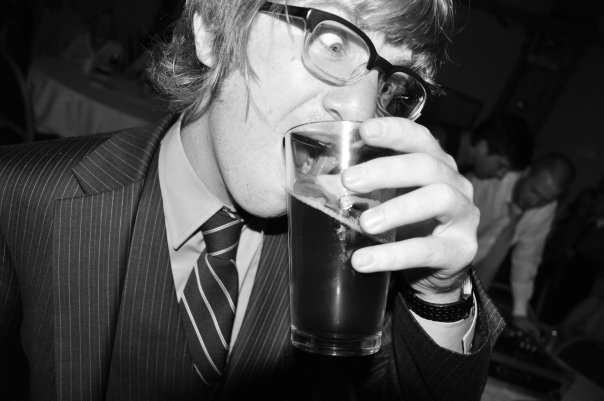

Background information
- Born: Andrew Brown; January 9, 1984 (age 42); Salem, Massachusetts, U.S.
- Genres: Pop rock; pop; alternative rock
- Occupations: Musician; multi-instrumentalist; songwriter
- Instruments: Guitar; vocals; piano; keyboards; percussion
- Years active: 2001–present
- Labels: Columbia; Mosley; Interscope
- Member of: OneRepublic; Debate Team
- Website: onerepublic.com

Andrew Brown (born January 9, 1984) is an American musician, multi-instrumentalist, and songwriter. He is a guitarist in the bands OneRepublic and Debate Team.

== Biography and career ==
Drew Brown originated from Salem, Massachusetts. He attended Broomfield High School in Broomfield, Colorado. He moved to Boston, Massachusetts in 2004, where he formed OneRepublic with vocalist Ryan Tedder and guitarist Zach Filkins.

In January 2011, Brown formed the band Debate Team with OK Go drummer Dan Konopka, Hush Sound guitarist Bob Morris, and vocalist Ryan McNeill. They released an EP that year titled Wins Again.

=== OneRepublic ===
Drew has been a guitar player for OneRepublic since 2002. Songs he has co-written for the band include "Say (All I Need)", "Stop and Stare", "All Fall Down," "Tyrant," and "Won't Stop" from their debut album Dreaming Out Loud; the title track from their second album Waking Up; and "Feel Again" and "Love Runs Out" from the band's third album Native.

=== Debate Team ===
Debate Team is a side project co-created by Drew Brown, vocalist Ryan McNeill, drummer Dan Konopka of OK Go, bassist Bob Morris of the Hush Sound and keyboardist Adam James. The band started out as a recording project by flatmates Brown and McNeill. With the success of Brown's main project, OneRepublic, the band went on hiatus until 2008.

In 2009, Konopka, James and Morris joined Brown and McNeill to complete the band. Throughout 2009 and 2010, the band began recording Wins Again. The EP was set to be released in Summer 2010, but was delayed until the start of 2011. In the meantime, the band released the tracks "Christmastime Alone", "Curious Pair", "My Expertise" and "Leave" onto their Facebook page.

== Discography ==
=== With OneRepublic ===
- Dreaming Out Loud (2007)
- Waking Up (2009)
- Native (2013)
- Oh My My (2016)
- Human (2021)
- Artificial Paradise (2024)

=== With Debate Team ===
- Wins Again EP (2011)
