= Mercy (Duffy song) =

2008 single by Duffy

Single by Duffy

from the album Rockferry
- B-side: "Save It for Your Prayers"; "Tomorrow"
- Released: 11 February 2008
- Studio: Bookerland
- Genre: Soul
- Length: 3:41
- Label: A&M
- Songwriters: Aimée Ann Duffy; Steve Booker
- Producer: Steve Booker

Duffy singles chronology
"Rockferry" (2007)	"Mercy" (2008)	"Warwick Avenue" (2008)

Music video
- "Mercy" on YouTube

"Mercy" is a song performed by the British soul singer Duffy, released as the second single from her debut studio album, Rockferry (2008). Co-written by Duffy and Steve Booker and produced by Booker, it was released worldwide in 2008 to critical acclaim and unprecedented chart success. As Duffy's first international release, the song is credited with firmly establishing her career and is now considered her signature song. "Mercy" received comparisons to Duffy's previous single, "Rockferry". Critical reviewers of "Mercy" noted similarities between the song to releases by Aretha Franklin, Dusty Springfield and the Supremes, as well as contemporaries such as fellow British singer Amy Winehouse.

"Mercy" was nominated for several awards in 2008, including the Grammy Award for Best Female Pop Vocal Performance at the 51st Grammy Awards. Well received by the public, "Mercy" peaked at number one on the UK Singles Chart in February 2008, remaining atop the chart for five weeks, and went on to become the third-best-selling single of 2008 in the United Kingdom, with sales of over 500,000 copies in the UK that year. It achieved worldwide chart success, topping the charts in Austria, Germany, Greece, the Netherlands, Norway, Republic of Ireland, Switzerland and Turkey, and peaked within the top five of the charts in Belgium, Denmark, France, Italy, Japan, New Zealand, Romania, Spain and Sweden. Duffy attributed the chart success to the fact that "everyone is searching for liberty ... from themselves or from the world they’ve created around them" and "everyone would like to be set free". It is Duffy's best-selling single to date.

The song has been covered several times since its original release, most notably by the cast of American musical television series Glee as well as by both The Fratellis and OneRepublic on BBC Radio 1's Live Lounge. The Glee version charted on the UK Singles Chart and in Ireland, and Duffy herself performed the song for the Live Lounge. The song was performed live at various music festivals as well as on Duffy's 2008–09 tour. Lynda Carter released her version of the song on her 2018 album "Red Rock & Blues."

== Writing and inspiration ==
"Mercy" was written by Duffy and Steve Booker during the final stages of completion for Rockferry. In an interview with Mojo, Duffy noted that she "felt something was missing and 'Mercy' was that missing thing", saying that herself and Booker were "writing it literally at the end, when the strings were being put on 'Rockferry' and 'Warwick Avenue". Duffy first met Booker by chance because she bought the flat in Ladbroke Grove that Booker had been renting. Booker's girlfriend met Duffy and then introduced the pair. Duffy has later noted of the experience:

"We went for coffee and I had this gut feeling that we should write together. I asked Jeanette [Lee] what she thought and she just said, we’ve made this record so go and have fun, be creative. By the end of hanging out in the studio for two weeks we had 'Mercy' and 'Stepping Stone'."

Duffy had already written the lyrics to "Mercy" before her meeting with Steve Booker, although she has since said that she "never [has] a plan as that always fails", in reference to the writing of the song. Duffy has noted that during recording with Booker, "Mercy" "was like this melodic poem in my mind, which I just had to get out, and I knew exactly what I wanted it to sound like". She has also said that they "built the song from the bottom up", also noting that it is "very important that my songs start from an organic source, rather than a drum loop". When asked of the lyrical meaning of the song, Duffy said:

"The lyrics were about having a feeling towards someone, whether it’s a romantic feeling or just some chemistry that you don’t want, and you desperately want to be released from that feeling."

According to Duffy, "Mercy" is autobiographical and is about "sexual liberty" and "not doing something somebody else wants you to do". Duffy has also said in an interview with Observer Music Monthly that she sings "Mercy" "several times a day and it's just like having sex every time". However, Duffy has expressed fear "about saying what a song is about" because she felt that the lyrical interpretation is her "issues and baggage and when someone else listens to the song it isn’t about my baggage anymore it’s about their baggage". According to Mark Edward Nero of About.com, the song is "a tale of lust".

In an interview with HitQuarters Booker said he searching for a song that you could imagine sending the audience crazy on the 1960s UK pop show Ready Steady Go!. After first trying to match "Stepping Stone" with this idea he then sang the fledgling "Mercy" and found it fit.

== Music structure and composition ==
"Mercy"
"Mercy" was compared to work by
Adele, Amy Winehouse, Aretha Franklin, and The Supremes.

"Mercy" is set in common time, with a tempo of 130 beats per minute and is written in the key of G Mixolydian. Duffy's vocal range spans from D_{4} to D_{6}.

Lyrically, "Mercy" is about "intense longing for an attractive guy". Mark Edward Nero of About.com noted that "[although] the song sets the stage for who Duffy is as an artist as well as a person" it was "still fairly tame, lyrically". The BBC Chart Blog compared the song to Aretha Franklin's "Chain of Fools" and "Where Are You Baby?" by Betty Boo.

The introduction to "Mercy" is similar to the opening bars of "Stand by Me" by Ben E. King. The sound is slightly different from that of "Stand by Me", however, because "Mercy" uses the 1st, 5th and flattened 7th degrees of the scale, instead of the 1st, 5th and major 7th. This change creates a bluesy sound. The song is written in the 12-bar blues form, using the chords I7, IV7 and V7.

== Critical reception ==
"Mercy" garnered overwhelming acclaim from critics, often being praised for its catchy bass line and "summery", jazzy themes. Digital Spy gave the single a positive review, noting that the single was "a catchy, danceable Northern soul pastiche" and that the "baseline practically reeks of sweat and stale cigarette smoke". The Times in a review for Rockferry said that "Mercy" is "a slight but darned catchy number" and "a classic radio hit". The reviewer also drew comparisons between "Mercy" and Amy Winehouse's critically acclaimed single "Rehab". The Independent said that "Mercy" and "Rockferry" "are tracks that stand out as something special", whilst noting that the "uptempo organ funk" provides "the album's one truly memorable groove". PopMatters said that the song was "still grounded in a bouncing Motown rhythm but [with] the added colour of jaunty keyboards", whilst again comparing the song to "Rehab".

The Observer, in an extremely positive review for Rockferry, said that "Mercy" "is a big, booming, finger-wagging sashay worthy of the Supremes". In a positive review for Rockferry, American music magazine Billboard said that "Mercy" "is about as summery as summery gets". NME, giving Rockferry a negative review, had a mixed attitude towards "Mercy", comparing the song's "Austin Powers organ" to work by Aretha Franklin. Slant said that the song has a "bass-heavy syncopated beat, "Yeah, yeah, yeah" refrain [and an] obvious '60s-pop frame of reference". However, the song was given negative comparisons to Amy Winehouse. "Mercy" also appeared on various critics' "Top" lists. Bill Lamb of About.com placed "Mercy" at number 29 in a list of his favourite 100 songs of 2008. Fred Bronson of Billboard placed "Mercy" at number two, whilst the magazine's Keith Caulfield placed "Mercy" in an alphabetical list of his favourite songs of 2008.

"60's pop star Dusty Springfield is smiling from beyond every time Duffy opens her mouth to sing."

— Bill Lamb, About.com

=== Awards and other recognition ===
"Mercy" won the 2008 MOJO Award for Song of the Year. MOJO editor Phil Alexander called the song a "timeless" classic that "could really have come from any period in time over the last 50 years". The single was nominated for a BRIT Award in 2009, for Best British Single. Duffy's performance of "Warwick Avenue" at the ceremony helped to increase sales of "Mercy" by double the market average before the broadcast. The song was also nominated for a Grammy Award in the category "Best Female Pop Vocal Performance". The song was also nominated during various award ceremonies including the MTV Europe Music Awards (Most Addictive Track), Q Awards (Best Track) and the 2009 Music Producers Guild Awards (UK Single of the Year). "Mercy" was also nominated for PRS for Most Performed Work and Best-selling British Song at the 2008 Ivor Novello Awards, winning in the former category. The song was the fourth most played anywhere in the United Kingdom in 2009, revealed in a list compiled by music body PRS.

== Chart performance ==
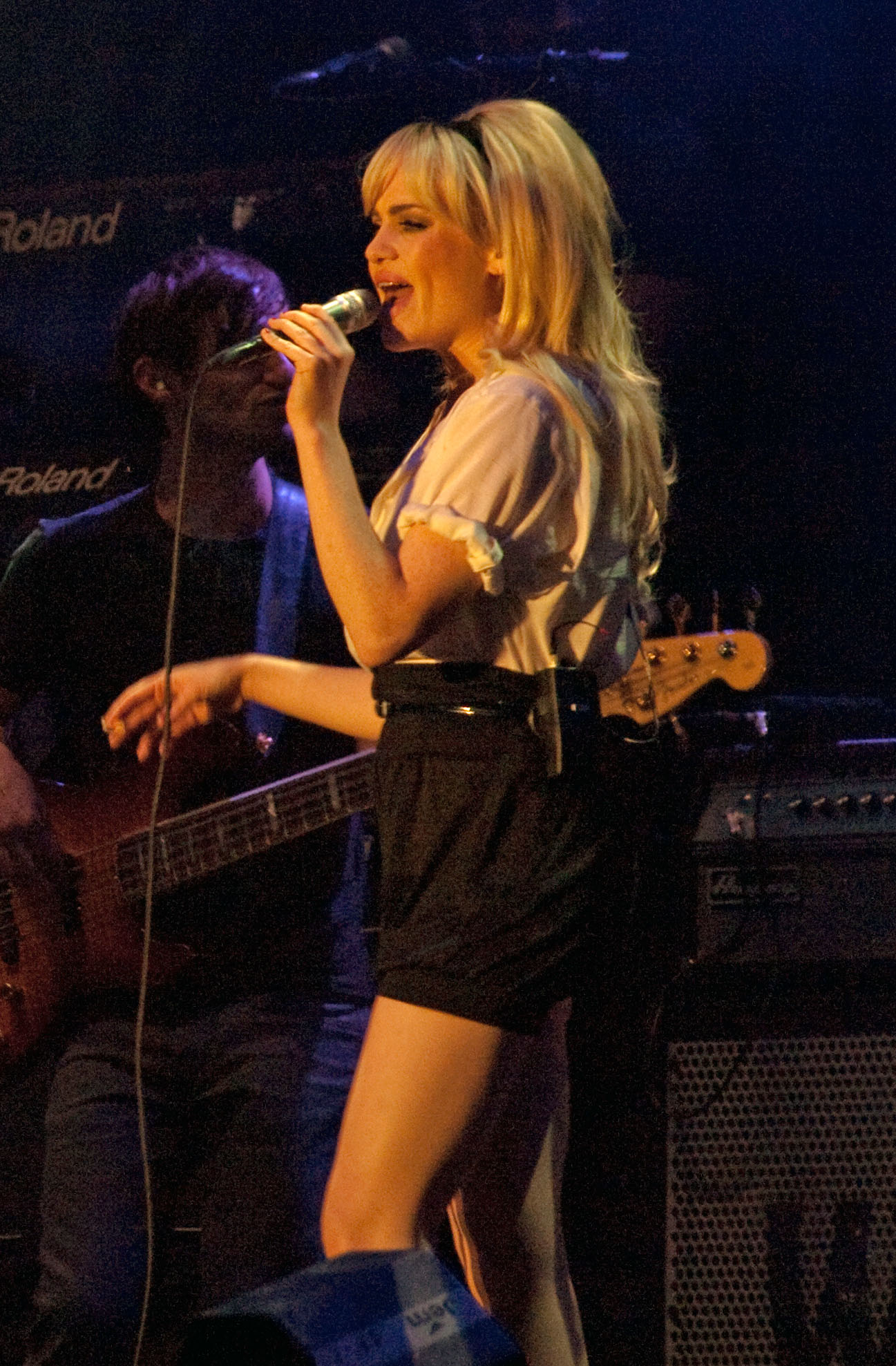
Duffy performing at the SOS 4.8 Festival in Murcia, Spain in 2009.

"Mercy" peaked at number-one on the UK Singles Chart solely on digital downloads on 17 February 2008 ― for the week ending dated 23 February 2008 ― three weeks before the physical release of the single. It remained at the top of the charts for five weeks until it was dethroned by "American Boy" by Estelle featuring Kanye West. "Mercy" was one of only three singles, all debuts, to achieve a five-week run at the top of the UK Singles Chart in 2008 ― the other two being "Now You're Gone" by Basshunter, which was ironically replaced at the top spot by "Mercy", and "I Kissed a Girl" by Katy Perry. "Mercy" became Britain's third-best-selling single of 2008, selling 536,000 copies in 2008 alone. The song remained inside the UK Singles Chart for over a year. One of the B-sides to the song, titled "Tomorrow", peaked far outside the top 100 of the UK Singles Chart.

Internationally, "Mercy" became Duffy's first single to chart on the American Billboard charts. "Mercy" debuted on the Billboard Hot 100 at number 87. On the chart date 22 May 2008, the single reached its peak of 27 on the Hot 100, becoming the chart's greatest digital gainer of that week, selling 59,000 downloads. The song also topped the magazine's Eurochart Hot 100, spending in total six weeks atop the chart, including four consecutive weeks. "Mercy" also reached other Billboard charts, including number 3 on the Japan Hot 100, number 27 on the Pop 100 and 13 on the Hot Digital Songs. The single was also a minor dance crossover success, reaching a peak of 35 on Billboard's Hot Dance Club Play chart, as well as peaking at a position of sixteen on the Adult Pop Songs chart. In the United States overall, "Mercy" was certified Platinum for sales of one million copies by the American recording industry association, the RIAA. In Canada, "Mercy" debuted at number 94 on the Canadian Hot 100 on 12 April 2008, eventually peaking at 11 on 23 April 2008.

"I think I’m a bit all-over the place, I can't quite handle it. I was aiming for top 40, possibly top 10, so I can genuinely tell you I am really blown away."

— Duffy, speaking to the Daily Post North Wales after the song reached number-one in the UK.

"Mercy" entered the Australian ARIA Singles Chart at number 50 on the issue date of 4 May 2008, reaching a peak of 26 nearly five months later, on 14 September 2008, after staying on the chart for eighteen weeks. Despite its small impact on the Australian charts, the single was the 72nd-best-selling single of 2008, and was certified Platinum for sales of 70,000 copies. "Mercy" debuted on New Zealand's RIANZ singles chart at 40, eventually peaking at number four. The single was the 30th-best-selling song of 2008 in New Zealand, where the song was later certified double platinum, for sales of 60,000 units.

In Europe, "Mercy" was a chart success, reaching number-one in at least eight countries in the region alone. In Ireland, "Mercy" proved very successful, spending two separate runs at number one in 2008. "Mercy" also topped the Hungarian Airplay Chart, Dutch Top 40, German Singles Chart, Greek IFPI Singles Chart, Norwegian Singles Charts, Swiss Singles Chart and the Ö3 Austria Top 40, amongst others.

== Music videos ==
The main version of "Mercy" shows Duffy standing on top of a platform inside a large hall whilst men dance around her.

The main-release music video for "Mercy", directed by Daniel Wolfe, features Duffy standing on top of a platform performing the song. Featured in the video are Northern soul dancers who dance to "Mercy". Choreographed by Natricia Bernard, the dancing involves elaborate moves, including the use of fire. "Mercy" was nominated for two awards at the UK Music Video Awards, for "People’s Choice Award" and "Best Pop Video". The music video was released to the UK iTunes Store on 26 January 2008, being the first release of "Mercy". In reaction to the video, RealMusic noted that Duffy "does manage to stand atop those platforms very well and sing without falling off in [the] video, so top marks for that".

A second music video release was made for the United States market, directed by Adria Petty. It shows Duffy performing live on stage whilst people dance to the song. The US version was given a positive review by Nick Levine of Digital Spy, who wrote that "It's glossy, full of young, good-looking types and proudly features a drum with Duffy's name printed on its skin – hey, that's success for you."

== Cover versions and usage in media ==
"Mercy" has been covered several times since its release. In 2008, American band OneRepublic recorded a version of the song which was first heard as a live cover on the BBC Radio 1 Live Lounge. Their version of the song later appeared, in live format, on the band's third single "Say (All I Need)". OneRepublic then recorded a studio version of "Mercy" as a bonus track for their second album Waking Up (note that the track is not to be confused with another OneRepublic song and single, also titled "Mercy" and released on their debut studio album, Dreaming Out Loud).

The Fratellis also recorded "Mercy", mixed with the Minder theme tune, specially for broadcast on the Live Lounge. Duffy herself also recorded "Mercy" live for the Live Lounge. In the broadcast, Duffy also sang a cover of Hot Chip's single "Ready for the Floor". British production team The Third Degree recorded a version, released 9 March 2009 on the Acid Jazz label as a 7-inch vinyl record. Singer John Mayer also covers the song as a slow blues in many of his live shows.

Glee cast version single cover.

The cast of the US "musical comedy" television series Glee covered the song for the third episode of the first series, "Acafellas". The cover was called "leg-splits-over-shoulders exciting" by The Wall Street Journal. The Glee cast's cover version was released as a single worldwide to promote the series, and reached numbers 94 and 49 on the UK and Irish singles charts, respectively.

This song also appeared on the soundtrack of the video game FIFA 09.

== Track listing ==
Digital download

1. "Mercy"

CD single

1. "Mercy"
2. "Tomorrow" (Duffy, Eg White)

UK 7" vinyl single

1. "Mercy"
2. "Save It for Your Prayers" (Duffy, Sacha Skarbek)

Australian digital download

1. "Mercy"
2. "Tomorrow"
3. "Oh Boy"
4. "Save It for Your Prayers"

UK B-side digital download

1. "Tomorrow"
2. "Save It for Your Prayers"

Premium CD single

1. "Mercy"
2. "Tomorrow"
3. "Oh Boy"
4. "Save It for Your Prayers"
5. "Mercy" music video

=== Remixes ===
Duffy has expressed that it was "fascinating to see people picking up on it ["Mercy"], taking it and creating something from it for their genre". Duffy told Mojo that her favourite remix of the song is by the Roots, calling it "amazing" and saying it "blew [her] away".

== Credits and personnel ==
- Duffy – vocals, writing
- Steve Booker – producer, mixer, recorder, programmer, guitar, bass, keyboard, writing

== Charts ==
=== Weekly charts ===
Chart (2008)	Peak position
Australia (ARIA)	26
Austria (Ö3 Austria Top 40)	1
Belgium (Ultratop 50 Flanders)	3
Belgium (Ultratop 50 Wallonia)	5
Canada Hot 100 (Billboard)	11
Croatia International Airplay (HRT)	1
Czech Republic Airplay (ČNS IFPI)	3
Denmark (Tracklisten)	2
Europe (Eurochart Hot 100)	1
Finland (Suomen virallinen lista)	3
France (SNEP)	2
Germany (GfK)	1
Germany Airplay (BVMI)	1
Greece (IFPI)	2
Hungary (Rádiós Top 40)	1
Ireland (IRMA)	1
Italy (FIMI)	3
Japan Hot 100 (Billboard)	3
Lithuania (EHR)	1
Mexico Anglo (Monitor Latino)	9
Netherlands (Dutch Top 40)	1
Netherlands (Single Top 100)	1
New Zealand (Recorded Music NZ)	4
Norway (VG-lista)	1
Portugal Digital Songs (Billboard)	1
Romania (Romanian Top 100)	4
Russia Airplay (TopHit)	73
Scottish Singles Sales (Official Charts)	1
Spain (Promusicae)	2
Sweden (Sverigetopplistan)	3
Switzerland (Schweizer Hitparade)	1
Turkey (Billboard)	1
UK Singles (Official Charts)	1
US Billboard Hot 100	27
US Adult Alternative Airplay (Billboard)	4
US Adult Pop Airplay (Billboard)	16
US Dance Club Songs (Billboard)	35
US Dance Airplay (Billboard)	17
US Pop Airplay (Billboard)	22
Venezuela Pop Rock (Record Report)	1

Chart (2012)	Peak position
South Korea International (Circle)	16
South Korea International (Circle) (Live at Apple Store Feb 08)	18

Chart (2016)	Peak position
Poland Airplay (ZPAV)	74

=== Year-end charts ===
Chart (2008)	Position
Australia (ARIA)	72
Austria (Ö3 Austria Top 40)	5
Belgium (Ultratop 50 Flanders)	6
Belgium (Ultratop 50 Wallonia)	18
Canada (Canadian Hot 100)	36
Croatia International Airplay (HRT)	10
Denmark (Tracklisten)	5
European Hot 100 Singles (Billboard)	2
Finland (Suomen virallinen lista)	5
France (SNEP)	7
Germany (Media Control GfK)	6
Hungary (Rádiós Top 40)	17
Ireland (IRMA)	13
Italy (FIMI)	14
Japan (Japan Hot 100)	23
Netherlands (Dutch Top 40)	13
Netherlands (Single Top 100)	5
New Zealand (RIANZ)	30
Spain (PROMUSICAE)	8
Sweden (Sverigetopplistan)	6
Switzerland (Schweizer Hitparade)	3
UK Singles (OCC)	3

=== Decade-end charts ===
Chart (2000–2009)	Position
Germany (Official German Charts)	26

== Certifications and sales ==
Region	Certification	Certified units/sales
Australia (ARIA)	Platinum	70,000^{^}
Austria (IFPI Austria)	Gold	15,000^{*}
Belgium (BRMA)	Gold	
Brazil (Pro-Música Brasil)	Gold	30,000^{‡}
Denmark (IFPI Danmark)	2× Platinum	30,000^{^}
Germany (BVMI)	Platinum	300,000^{‡}
Italy 2008 sales	—	70,000
New Zealand (RMNZ)	2× Platinum	60,000^{‡}
South Korea (Gaon)	—	281,897
Spain (Promusicae) 2008 sales	3× Platinum	60,000^{*}
Spain (Promusicae) Sales + streams since 2015	Gold	30,000^{‡}
Sweden (GLF)	Gold	10,000^{^}
Switzerland (IFPI Switzerland)	Gold	15,000^{^}
United Kingdom (BPI)	2× Platinum	1,200,000^{‡}
United States (RIAA)	Platinum	1,000,000^{*}
^{*} Sales figures based on certification alone.^{^} Shipments figures based on certification alone.^{‡} Sales+streaming figures based on certification alone.

== Release history ==
Region	Date	Format
United Kingdom	11 February 2008	Digital download
United Kingdom	25 February 2008	CD single digital download; (B-sides); 7"
Europe (aside from the UK)	7 March 2008	CD
Europe (aside from the UK)	21 March 2008	Maxi single
Australia	11 February 2008	Digital download
Australia	8 March 2008	
Australia	21 March 2008	Digital download EP
Worldwide	21 March 2008	CD single; premium CD
United States	29 April 2008	
United States	17 June 2008	Digital download remix (featuring The Game)
Japan	20 August 2008	CD
