= Sweetest Poison =

2004 single by Nu Pagadi

Single by Nu Pagadi

from the album Your Dark Side
- Released: 13 December 2004
- Recorded: December 2004
- Studio: Weryton (Unterföhring, Munich)
- Length: 3:52
- Label: Cheyenne
- Composer(s): Jörn-Uwe Fahrenkrog-Petersen; Lukas Hilbert
- Lyricist(s): Jörn-Uwe Fahrenkrog-Petersen; Lukas Hilbert; R. G.
- Producer(s): Jörn-Uwe Fahrenkrog-Petersen; Lukas Hilbert

Nu Pagadi singles chronology
"Sweetest Poison" (2004)	"Dying Words" (2005)

Music video
- "Sweetest Poison" on YouTube

"Sweetest Poison" is a song by short-lived German pop band Nu Pagadi. After winning the fourth series of German reality television show Popstars in 2004, Nu Pagadi recorded "Sweetest Poison" and released it as their debut single on 13 December 2004. Written by Jörn-Uwe Fahrenkrog-Petersen, Lukas Hilbert, and Rea Garvey (as "R. G."), the song became a number-one hit in Germany, Austria, and Switzerland and was included on the band's only studio album, Your Dark Side, the following year. Despite the song's success, Nu Pagadi would release one more single before disbanding less than a year after winning Popstars.

== Background and release ==
On 8 December 2004, during the concluding episode of Popstars series four, Patrick Boinet, Kristina Dörfer, Markus Grimm, and Doreen Steinert were chosen as the four winners of the competition after singing "Sweetest Poison", written by Lukas Hilbert, Rea Garvey (as "R. G."), and Nena keyboardist Jörn-Uwe Fahrenkrog-Petersen. Following their victory, the quartet received the band name Nu Pagadi and recorded a studio version of "Sweetest Poison" that would be released as a single. Five days after the programme's conclusion, on 13 December, Cheyenne Records issued the "Sweetest Poison" single in German-speaking Europe across the two formats: a CD single and a Pock It! mini-CD single. The mini-CD contains the original version of "Sweetest Poison" plus an instrumental while the regular CD features two additional mixes: an "Electromix" and an extended version. In 2005, the song and its Electromix were included on Nu Pagaldi's only studio album, Your Dark Side.

== Commercial performance and aftermath ==
"Sweetest Poison" debuted atop the German Singles Chart on 27 December 2004, staying there for only one week before falling to number two for three weeks. Afterwards, the song descended the chart, staying in the top 100 for 14 weeks until dropping out on 4 April 2005. In Austria, the single debuted at number one on the Ö3 Singles Chart on 26 December 2004. It spent a further three weeks atop the chart before losing the number-one spot on 23 January 2005. The track spent 17 weeks on the Austrian chart and was certified gold by the International Federation of the Phonographic Industry (IFPI) for selling over 15,000 copies. On Switzerland's Hitparade listing, "Sweetest Poison" first appeared at number two on 2 January 2005, rising to number one the following week and staying there for three issues in total. The song spent eight more weeks on the ranking, last appearing at number 97 on 20 March.

After "Sweetest Poison", Nu Pagaldi released their second and final single, "Dying Words", which stalled at number 22 in Germany and failed to reach the top 30 in Austria and Switzerland. In May 2005, Steinert left the band due to creative differences, and four months later, the band permanently disbanded for the same reason.

== Track listings ==
German CD single

1. "Sweetest Poison" (original version) – 3:52
2. "Sweetest Poison" (Elektromix) – 5:55
3. "Sweetest Poison" (extended version) – 4:50
4. "Sweetest Poison" (instrumental) – 3:52

German mini-CD single

1. "Sweetest Poison" (original version) – 3:52
2. "Sweetest Poison" (instrumental) – 3:52

== Credits and personnel ==
Credits are lifted from the German CD single liner notes.

Credits

- Recorded at Weryton Studios (Unterföhring, Munich)
- Mixed at Jeopark (Hamburg, Germany)

Personnel

- Jörn-Uwe Fahrenkrog-Petersen – music, lyrics, keyboards, production
- Lukas Hilbert – music, lyrics, guitar, production
- R. G. (Rea Garvey) – lyrics
- Nu Pagadi – vocals
- Derek von Krogh – guitar, keyboards, co-production, additional programming
- Peter Keller – guitar
- Robert Smith – drums
- Jeo – mixing
- Claudia Macias – artwork
- Oliver S. – cover photo

== Charts ==
=== Weekly charts ===
Chart (2004–2005)	Peak position
Austria (Ö3 Austria Top 40)	1
Europe (Eurochart Hot 100)	6
Germany (GfK)	1
Switzerland (Schweizer Hitparade)	1

=== Year-end charts ===
Chart (2005)	Position
Austria (Ö3 Austria Top 40)	15
Europe (Eurochart Hot 100)	82
Germany (Media Control GfK)	17
Switzerland (Schweizer Hitparade)	31

== Certifications ==
Region	Certification	Certified units/sales
Austria (IFPI Austria)	Gold	15,000^{*}
^{*} Sales figures based on certification alone.
