= Roland Frei =

Swiss footballer and manager (born 1948)

Personal information
- Date of birth: 25 March 1948 (age 78)
- Place of birth: Diessenhofen, Switzerland
- Position: Midfielder

Senior career*
| Years | Team | Apps | (Gls) |
| 1967–1968 | FC Diessenhofen | | |
| 1968–1969 | FC St. Gallen II | | |
| 1969–1970 | FC Uster | | |
| 1970–1971 | FC Frauenfeld | | |
| 1971–1974 | FC Schaffhausen | | |

Managerial career
- 1976: FC Diessenhofen
- 1976–1982: SV Jestetten
- 1982–1986: VFC Neuhausen
- 1986–1988: FC Schaffhausen
- 1989–1991: FC Frauenfeld
- 1992–1993: FC Beringen
- 1994–1995: FC Schaffhausen (technical director)
- 1996–1998: FC Beringen
- 1999–2001: SC Schaffhausen
- 2003: VFC Neuhausen
- 2014–2015: FC Neunkirch
- 2015–2018: FC Diessenhofen
- * Club domestic league appearances and goals

Roland Frei (born 25 March 1948) is a retired Swiss football midfielder and later manager.
