= ...Moji =

Studio album by Salome
- Released: May 28, 2005
- Recorded: 2005
- Genre: Pop
- Length: 41:27
- Label: Universal
- Producer: Steve Jolly, Tony Swain

...Moji is the debut album by the 2005 Swiss MusicStar winner, Salome. Released on May 28, 2005, the album includes the Swiss number one single "Gumpu", as well as various other pop-orientated songs.

The album entered the charts on June 12, 2005 at #2, and stayed on the album chart for just under three months.

== Track listing ==
No.	Title	Length
1.	"Jetzt Odr Nie!"	3:34
2.	"Gumpu"	3:40
3.	"Eifach Ga"	3:03
4.	"Luft"	3:25
5.	"Nid Mine Tag"	3:37
6.	"Häb Nid Z Gfühl"	4:02
7.	"Adrenalin"	3:22
8.	"Desirée"	3:16
9.	"Boarde"	3:07
10.	"Fröinda"	3:49
11.	"Nid Wie D'Andre"	3:38
12.	"Rägu Und Tropfe"	2:46
