= Gumpu =

Single by Salome

from the album ...Moji
- Released: April 30, 2005
- Recorded: 2005
- Genre: Pop
- Length: 3:38
- Label: Universal Music
- Producer(s): Roland Frei

"Gumpu" is the debut single by Salome, the winner of Swiss MusicStars 2005. Released in Switzerland on April 30, 2005, the song entered the Swiss charts on May 15 at number one. It stayed there for three weeks, outperforming artists such as Akon, Chipz, Snoop Dogg and Shakira. Despite the success of "Gumpu" and her debut album ...Moji, Salome has not been in the Swiss charts since, seemingly becoming a one-hit wonder. The version of "Gumpu" on the album is two seconds longer than the version on the CD single.

== Track listing ==
1. "Gumpu" (Radio Edit) [03:38]
2. "Gumpu" (Karaoke Version) [03:38]
