= Zach Filkins =

American guitarist (born 1978)

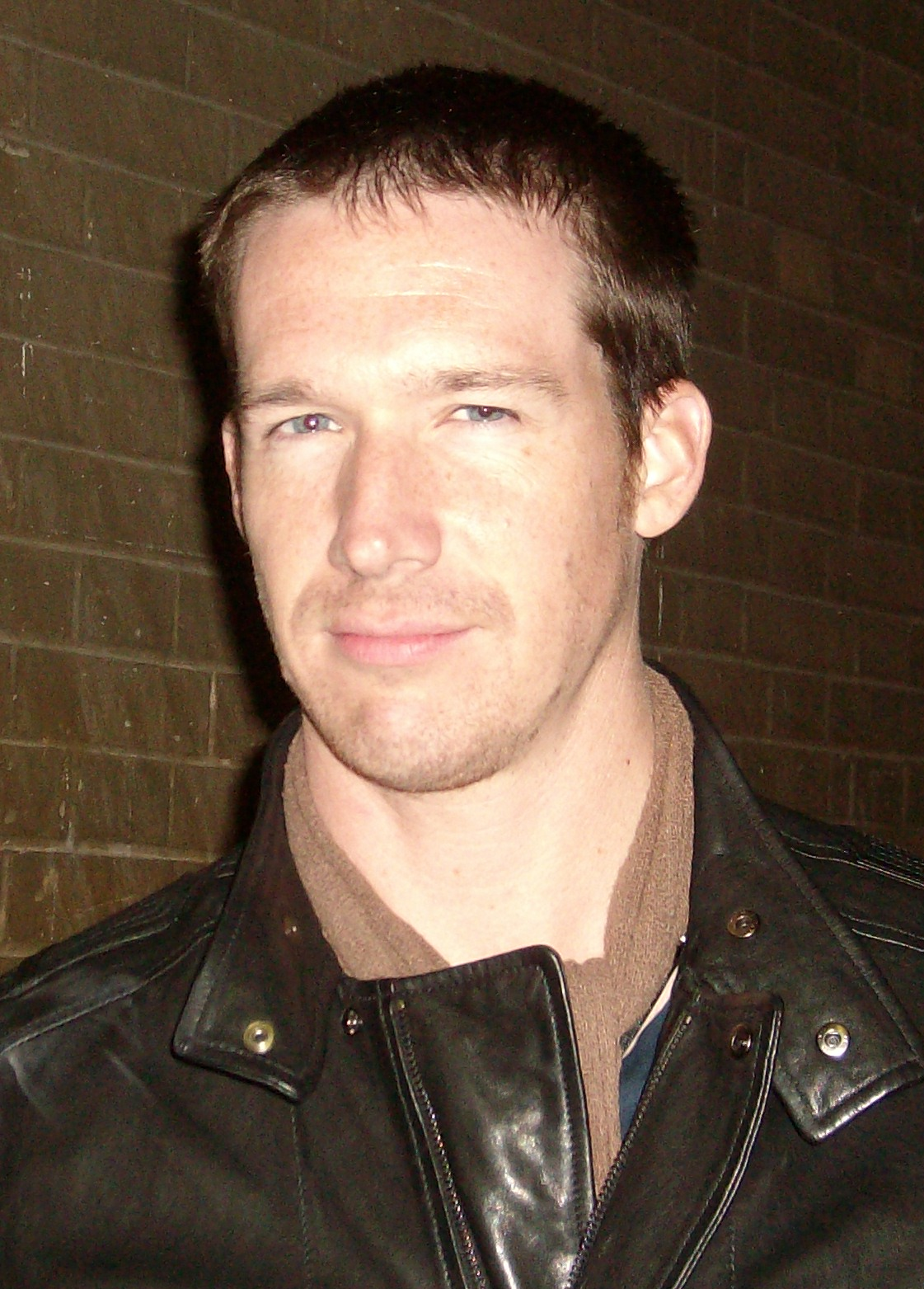
- Filkins in 2008

Background information
- Born: Zachary Douglas Filkins; September 15, 1978 (age 48); Colorado Springs, Colorado, U.S.
- Genres: Pop rock; pop; alternative rock
- Occupation: Guitarist
- Member of: OneRepublic

Zachary Douglas Filkins (born September 15, 1978) is an American musician who is the lead guitarist and a founding member of the pop rock band OneRepublic.

== Early life ==
A significant part of Filkins's childhood was spent intensely studying classical guitar in Barcelona, Spain. He attended Colorado Springs Christian High School in Colorado Springs, Colorado, where he played for the school soccer team. It was at the high school that he met future bandmate Ryan Tedder during their senior year. During a drive home, Filkins and Tedder were discussing their favorite musicians and decided to form a band. They began performing in a group called 'This Beautiful Mess' with some of their friends, playing small gigs attended by friends and family. After the end of their senior year, Tedder and Filkins parted ways, each attending different colleges.

== Career ==
=== Music career ===
In 2002, Filkins got a call from Tedder asking him if he still wanted to put together a band. Tedder convinced Filkins to move to Los Angeles from Chicago. After a few lineup changes, the band solidified with Tedder on keyboards and lead vocals, Filkins and Drew Brown on guitar, Brent Kutzle on bass and cello, and Eddie Fisher on drums and percussion. After only nine months in Los Angeles, they were signed to Columbia Records and recorded a full album, which took two years. Two months before the album was set to be released, they were dropped from the label. As soon as they were dropped, the band's MySpace profile took off and they soon became the number one unsigned act in the social networking site. A number of labels offered them a record deal including Interscope Records. Although hesitant to go under another major record label the band signed to Interscope under Timbaland's Mosley Music Group, as its first rock band.

Filkins performing with OneRepublic

Filkins plays guitar, viola and sings background vocals for the band. In addition to guitar and background vocals, along with Brent Kutzle, he also aids friend and co-founder Ryan Tedder in writing and composing music for the band. Filkins shares writing and composing credits on the songs "All Fall Down", "Prodigal", "Say (All I Need)", "Sleep", "Something's Not Right Here", "Stop and Stare", "Tyrant" and "Won't Stop" from the band's first album, Dreaming Out Loud.

=== Other ventures ===
Before moving to Los Angeles and starting OneRepublic, Filkins did some modeling on the side in Chicago. He worked under Maximum Talent Agency and was featured in a few brands ads such as on Covington and Jockey Underwear. His torso image can still be seen on some packages of Jockey Underwear.

Filkins was a judge for the 10th and 11th annual The Independent Music Awards to support independent artists' careers.

Filkins guest-starred as a forest ranger in the hit crime series Criminal Minds, Season 7 episode 6, titled "Epilogue".

== Personal life ==
Filkins and his wife Lindsay have a son born in 2010. He openly thanked and acknowledged her in the liner notes of OneRepublic's debut album, Dreaming Out Loud (2007).

He and his wife own a vineyard and winery in Michigan.

Filkins speaks Spanish fluently.
