= Daniel Kandlbauer =

Swiss pop musician (born 1983)

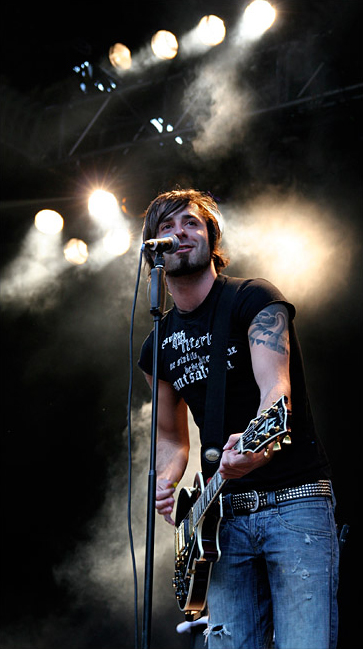
Kandlbauer in concert.

Daniel Kandlbauer (born 1983) is a Swiss pop musician who achieved notoriety on the Swiss reality show MusicStars. Kandlbauer was one of the finalists of the show, and he performed songs on several of their successful singles and albums. Since the show's climax, he has released a single entitled "Maybe In Heaven". The single charted on 7 August 2005 and peaked at number three.

He has written a song about the Eiger Ultra Trail named "This is your time".
