= Nu Pagadi =

German pop band

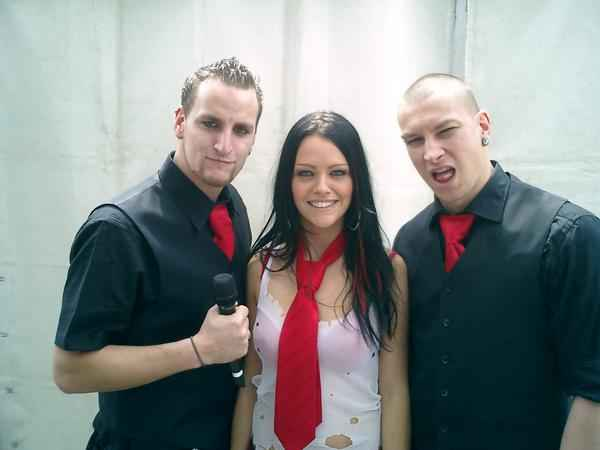
- L-R: Markus Grimm, Kristina Dörfer, Patrick Boinet

Background information
- Origin: Germany
- Genres: Pop, rock, glam rock
- Years active: 2004–2005
- Labels: Cheyenne / Polydor
- Past members: Patrick "Pat" Boinet; Kristina "Kris" Dörfer; Markus Grimm; Doreen Steinert (Nov. 2004 – May 2005)

Nu Pagadi was a German pop band, formed in December 2004 on the fourth season of international reality television program Popstars. Originally a quartet, from May 2005 a trio, the group described their own musical style as "glam rock". In September 2005, only ten months after the band's formation, the members announced their official split due to musical differences.

In May 2005, the band changed from being a quartet to being a trio when Doreen Steinert left.

The band's name refers to the Russian language, Soviet-era cartoon-series of the 1970s and 1980s called "Nu, pogodi!" which means "Well, Just You Wait!".

== Members ==
=== Kristina Dörfer ===
Kristina Dörfer (born 26 July 1984 in Wurzen) has also used the stage names KR!S and Kris.

=== Doreen Steinert ===
Doreen Steinert (born 4 November 1986 in Potsdam) was a candidate in the third season of the German edition of Popstars, reaching the last 50. After leaving Nu Pagadi, Steinert released a solo single, Der Brief (den ich nie schrieb), which reached number 29 in the German charts, in August 2005. In 2006, she released another single, Ich bin meine eigene Frau, which reached number 66 in Germany.

=== Patrick Boinet ===
Patrick "Pat" Boinet (born 5 January 1976 in Berlin) qualified for the German edition of Popstars in a Second-Chance-Casting. He qualified for that round via the Sat.1 show Star Search. After the breakup of Nu Pagadi, he appeared as a member of the jury in the Viva TV show Shibuya.

=== Markus Grimm ===
Markus Grimm (born 5 May 1979 in Moers) worked as a music journalist for the magazine plugged and sang in the group Cabrit Sans Cor before he was chosen to join Nu Pagadi. He continued working for plugged while he was a member. He is also a songwriter. After writing songs for various singers including Claus Eisenmann, a former member of Söhne Mannheims, he has announced a book, Cosmic Dancer, to be published in spring 2009.

== Discography ==
=== Albums ===
Year	Title	Peak chart positions		
Year	Title	GER	AUT	SWI
2005	Your Dark Side	1	5	6

=== Singles ===
Year	Title	Peak chart positions			Album
Year	Title	GER	AUT	SWI	Album
2004	"Sweetest Poison"	1	1	1	Your Dark Side
2005	"Dying Words"	22	36	47	Your Dark Side
