= Yandell =

Yandell is both a surname and given name.

== Surname ==
- Benjamin Yandell (1951–2004), American author
- David Wendel Yandell (1826–1898), American physician and educator
- Enid Yandell (1869–1934), American sculptor
- Keith Yandell (1938–2020), American philosopher and writer
- Lance Yandell (born 1970), American football player
- Lunsford Yandell (1805–1878), American physician and educator
- Lunsford Yandell Jr. (1837–1884), American physician and educator
- Paul Yandell (1935–2011), American musician
- Ralph Yandell (1892–1982), British gymnast

== Given name ==
- Yandell Henderson (1873–1944), American physiologist
