= Harriette Colenso =

English Christian missionary (1847–1932)

Harriette Emily Colenso
- Born: 30 June 1847; Tharston, Norfolk, England
- Died: 2 June 1932 (aged 84); Sweetwaters, Union of South Africa
- Other names: Udhlwedhlwe
- Occupation: Missionary
- Years active: 1862–1913
- Father: John Colenso

Harriette Emily Colenso (30 June 1847 – 2 June 1932) was an English Christian missionary in southern Africa. She was the eldest of five children of John Colenso, the first Bishop of Natal, and continued his work, interceding on behalf of the Zulu people before the British Government. She made representations to the Crown on behalf of Dinuzulu and his uncles, in exile on St Helena from 1890 to 1897.

== Early life ==
Harriette Emily Colenso was born in Tharston, Norfolk, England, in 1847. Her aunt was the missionary Harriette McDougall. She was the eldest of the five children of Sarah Frances (born Bunyon) and John Colenso, who would become the first bishop of Natal. Her siblings were Frances, Robert, Francis (Frank) and Agnes. As a child in Natal, she was nicknamed Udhlwedhlwe, which translates to Walking Stick, signifying her role as support and guide to her father.

== Work ==
During the trial of Langalibalele from 1874 to 1875, in which her father was defending the accused, Miss Colenso served as his secretary.

After the death of her father in 1883, she pursued his two main aims in Natal, namely the continuation of the Church of England in Natal, and defending the rights of the native population of Natal and Zululand.

Colenso fought against the attitudes of those, such as Sir Theophilus Shepstone, whose policy it was to undermine the Zulu royal family, granting minor chiefs their own chiefdoms, and to foster intertribal strife.

She advised Dinuzulu to give himself up to the British authorities in 1888. For his defence she obtained the services of leading counsel Harry Escombe and she herself worked hard in his defence. She convinced Sir Marshal Clarke, Resident Commissioner in Zululand from 1893 to 1897, of her point of view and he in turn persuaded London that Dinuzulu be permitted to return from exile in St Helena and be given the position of induna and confidant of the Government. Colenso, however, made the error in 1894 of supporting the annexation of Zululand by Natal in return for Dinuzulu's release.

Colenso's influence amongst native leaders can be seen in her discussion with Martin Lutuli and Saul Msane in 1900 regarding the formation of the Natal Native Congress, a precursor of the African National Congress.

After the troubles in Zululand of 1906–7, Colenso once again advised Dinuzulu to surrender to the authorities in Natal. Again she came to his defence, obtaining W. P. Schreiner as his counsel, and financially ruining herself in the process, despite a grant for his defence of £2,100 from the Imperial Government. Her evidence and that of the Natal Native Affairs Commission of 1906–7 led the Colonial Office to insist on a fair trial for Dinuzulu, with an impartial Judge President from outside Natal.

After the creation of the Union of South Africa in 1910, Louis Botha's Government released Dinuzulu, at least in part as a result of Colenso's intermediation.

Colenso's efforts to sustain the Church of England in Natal failed with the passing of the South African Church Properties Act in 1910, which reintegrated Church of England lands into the Church of the Province of South Africa. Both she and her sister Agnes lost their home in Bishopstowe and were relocated to Pietermaritzburg.

After Dinuzulu's death in 1913, Colenso became much less active. Her influence was waning. In her sixties, the issues affecting native people had changed to those of industrialisation and urbanisation. Her appeals to the British Government were of lesser impact after the granting of autonomy to the Union of South Africa. She was also burdened with debt.

== Death and legacy ==
Harriette Colenso died on 2 June 1932 in Sweetwaters. Alice Werner dedicated her work of 1933, Myths and Legends of the Bantu, to Harriette Colenso and her sister Agnes Mary Colenso.
