= Enid Yandell =

American sculptor (1869–1934)

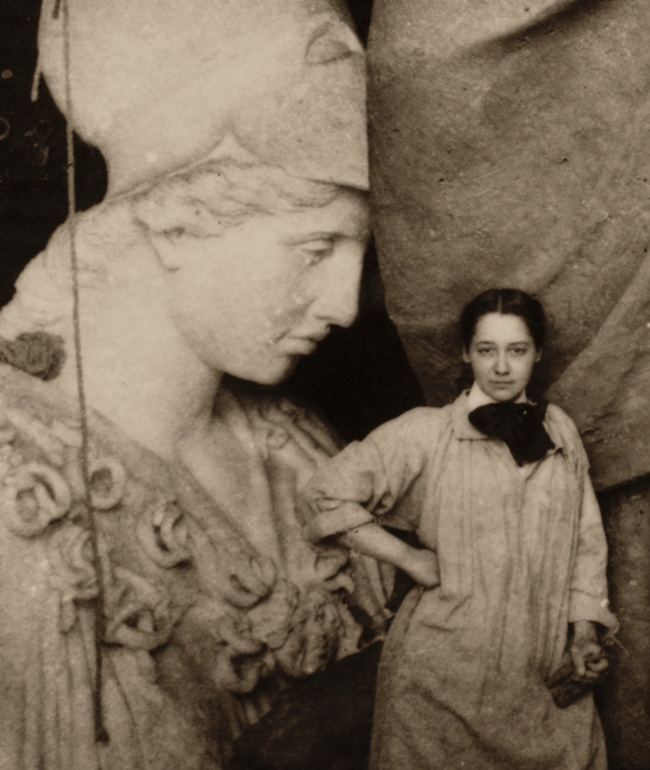
- Enid Yandell with her sculpture of Pallas Athena, 1896
- Born: October 6, 1869; Louisville, Kentucky, U.S.
- Died: June 12, 1934 (aged 64); Boston, Massachusetts, U.S.
- Resting place: Cave Hill Cemetery; Louisville, Kentucky, U.S.
- Father: Lunsford Yandell Jr.
- Relatives: David Wendel Yandell (uncle); Lunsford Yandell (grandfather)

Enid Yandell (October 6, 1869 – June 12, 1934) was an American sculptor from Louisville, Kentucky, who studied with Auguste Rodin in Paris, Philip Martiny in New York City, and Frederick William MacMonnies.

Yandell specialized in portrait busts and monuments. She created numerous portraits, garden pieces and small works as well as public monuments. The sculpture collection at the Speed Art Museum in her hometown includes a large number of her works in plaster. She contributed to The Woman's Building at the Chicago World's Fair.

== Artistic training ==
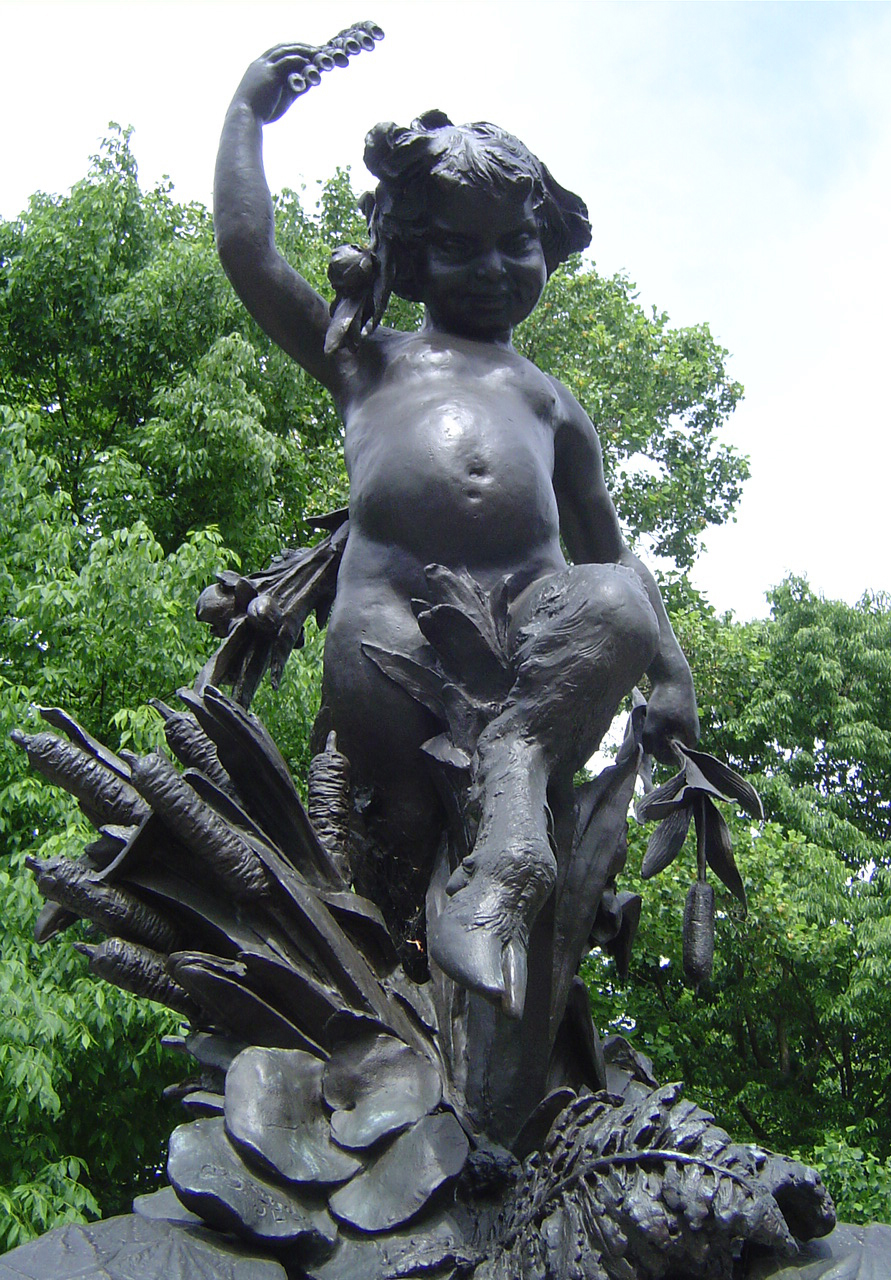
Statue of Pan, detail of Hogan's Fountain (1905) in Cherokee Park in Louisville

Yandell was the eldest daughter of Dr. Lunsford Pitts Yandell Jr. and Louise Elliston Yandell of Louisville, Kentucky. Her sister Maud Yandell (1871–1962) also never married; Elsie Yandell (1874–1939) married the American architect Donn Barber and moved to New York; and, their younger brother, Lunsford P. Yandell III (1878–1927) married Elizabeth Hosford of Connecticut and lived in Kentucky. Enid Yandell completed degrees in chemistry and art at Hampton College, a school for girls in Louisville. She then attended the Art Academy of Cincinnati, where she completed a four-year program in two years, winning a first-prize medal upon graduation in 1889. Yandell also took advantage of apprenticeships with noted sculptors of the day. These included Lorado Taft, Philip Martiny and Karl Bitter.

Yandell was one of a group of women sculptors known as the White Rabbits, who were organized by sculptor Lorado Taft to complete the numerous statues and other architectural embellishments for the Horticultural Building at the World's Columbian Exposition in Chicago in 1893. She also designed and carved the caryatid that supported the roof garden of The Woman's Building. Yandell co-wrote a semi-autobiographical account of her involvement in planning the fair, Three Girls in a Flat (1892). (This book is not to be confused with a British one of the same title by Ethel F. Heddle, published in 1896, a roman a clef featuring Ménie Muriel Dowie, Lillias Campbell Davidson, and Alice Werner, describing 'the ambivalent experience when the freedom of living alone collides with “the sordid, matter-of-fact worries incident on having very little money.”')

In 1894, Yandell went to Paris, where she studied with Frederick William MacMonnies and other instructors at the Académie Vitti in Montparnasse. Yandell also worked with Auguste Rodin. She returned to Paris frequently, maintaining a studio there and exhibiting at the Paris Salon.

In 1898 Yandell became the first woman member to join the National Sculpture Society. In 1899 her sister Elsie married the architect Donn Barber. Yandell died on June 12, 1934, in Boston, Massachusetts, and is buried in Cave Hill Cemetery in Louisville, Kentucky, Section O, Lot 396.

== Daniel Boone sculpture ==
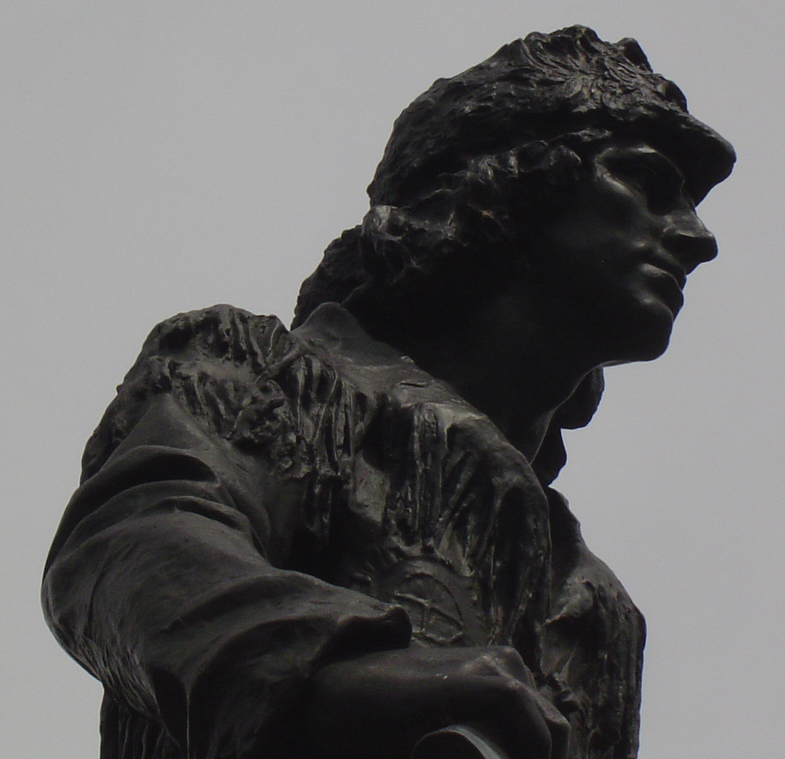
Daniel Boone statue (detail) at the foot of Eastern Parkway in Louisville

Sculptures by Yandell include a nine-foot statue of Daniel Boone, which was commissioned by the Filson Club of Louisville and exhibited outside the Kentucky Building at the 1893 Chicago World's Fair. Yandell completed a plaster cast which was shown at several exhibitions before C. C. Bickel finally arranged to have the work cast in bronze for the city of Louisville in 1906. The Daniel Boone sculpture survived the Super Outbreak of tornadoes on April 3, 1974, and is now located in Cherokee Park, Louisville, Kentucky. Another casting of the Boone statue was made in 1967 and placed on the campus of Eastern Kentucky University in Richmond, Kentucky.

== Tennessee Centennial International Exposition ==
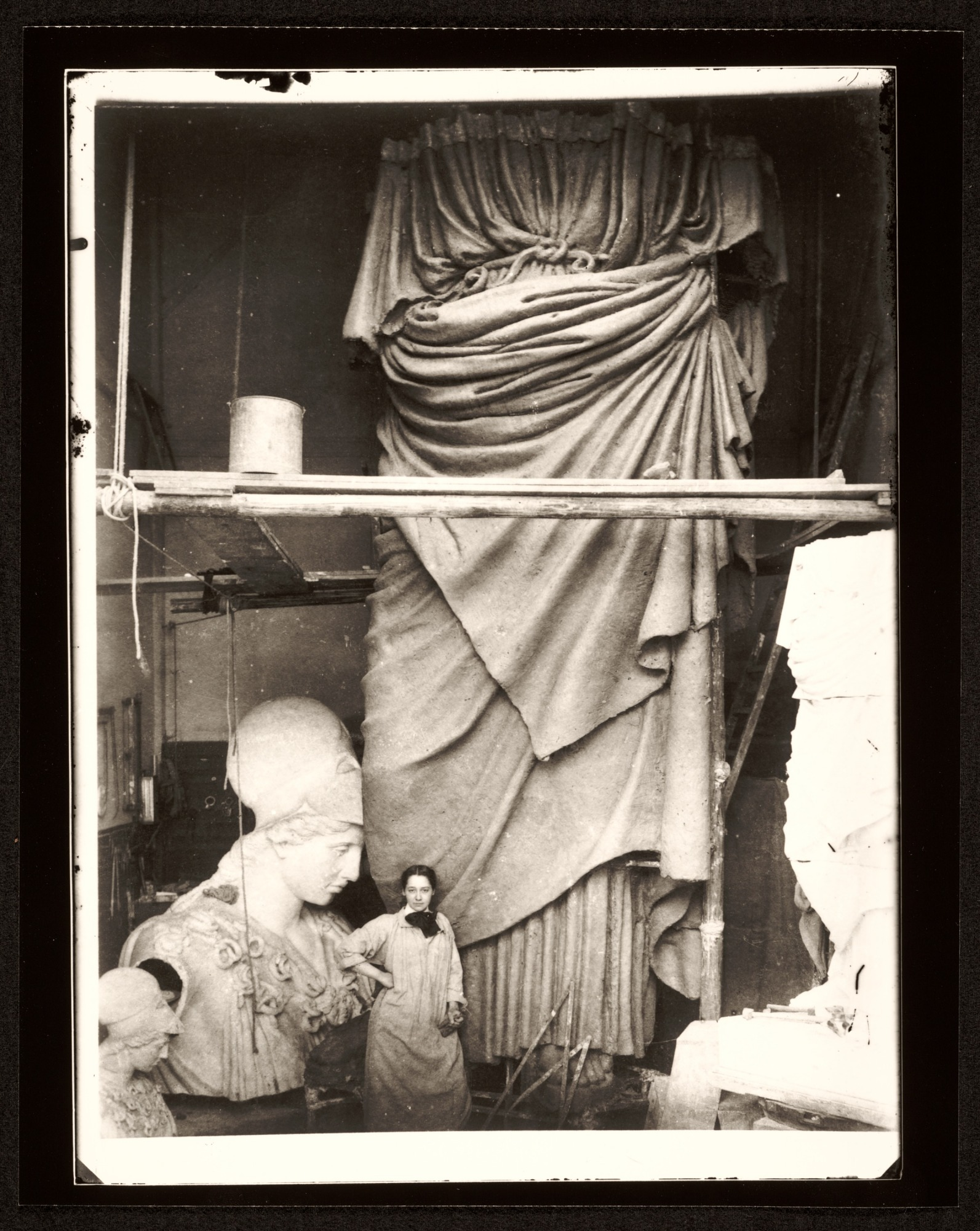
Yandell with her Pallas Athena, 1896

At age 27, Yandell was commissioned to create a monumental sculpture of Pallas Athena for the 1897 Tennessee Centennial and International Exposition. The Greek sculpture was in keeping with Nashville's nickname as "The Athens of the South."

Yandell created the statue in her studio in Paris. She based the design on the Pallas de Velletri, found near Rome, Italy, in the eighteenth century, which was itself a copy of an ancient Greek statue. It depicted Athena with one arm raised victoriously and the other arm with upturned palm in a gesture of welcome. The 40-foot sculpture was shipped to Nashville in sections by ship. The statue was assembled in Nashville and stood before the exposition's Fine Arts Building, which was built as a full-size replica of the Parthenon in Athens.

Like other statues in the exhibition, Yandell's Athena was made from staff, a non-permanent building material. The sculpture was never cast in bronze and within a year it deteriorated to pieces. The Nashville Parthenon was rebuilt in permanent materials, and still stands today. An entirely different Athena statue by Alan LeQuire, unveiled in 1990, stands inside the Nashville Parthenon.

== The Wheelmen's Bench ==
Wheelmen's Bench (detail) (1897) by Enid Yandell in Louisville, Kentucky

The Wheelmen's Bench is another significant sculpture by Yandell. Also in Louisville, it is located at the intersection of Third Street and Southern Parkway. The sculpture was part of an 1890s civic event dedicating a new bicycle path from downtown Louisville to Iroquois Park. A historical marker formerly located at the site read as follows:

Erected 1897 by Ky. Div. of League of American Wheelmen to honor cycling pioneer A. D. Ruff (1827–96) of Owingsville, Ky. The League's oldest member, he had bicycled to Yellowstone National Park in 1893. Marble fountain and stone bench, known to generations of cyclists as "Wheelmen's Bench," designed by famed sculptor Enid Yandell.
Cycle Carnival, 1897 – On October 8, 1897, a parade of 10,000 cyclists passed here to celebrate a new cinder bicycling path along Southern Parkway. Viewed by 50,000 spectators, parade began at Third and Broadway and ended at Iroquois Cycle Club. Many cyclists were in costume; ladies wore bloomers. Bugles and cannon fire marked the parade's progress. Presented by The Louisville Bicycle Club – 1997.

== Struggle of Life ==
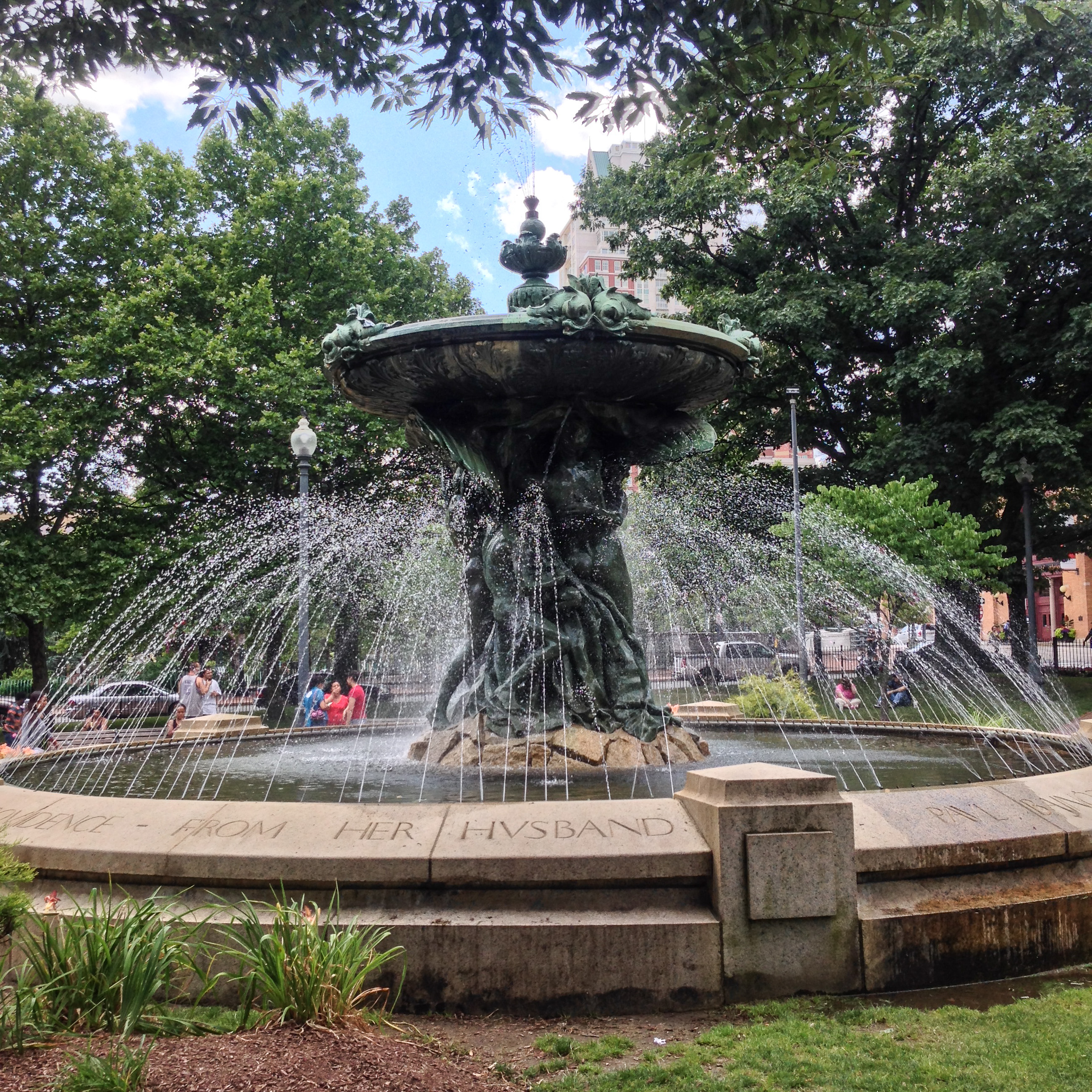
Bajnotti Fountain, aka Struggle of Life

Enid Yandell's sculpture the "Struggle of life" was commissioned by Italian diplomat Paul Bajnotti, of Turin, Italy, in memory of his wife Carrie Brown. Dedicated in 1899, the Carrie Brown Memorial (also referred to as the Bajnotti Fountain) is located in Burnside Park in downtown Providence, Rhode Island. She exhibited a plaster version of the fountain - then named "Struggle of Existence" - for the 1901 Pan-American Exposition in Buffalo, New York. The group of five figures was described in a contemporary journal article as "the struggle of the Spirit of Life to escape from the hampering influence of Duty, Avarice, and Passion." Yandell described the sculpture as representing "the attempt of the immortal soul within us to free itself from the handicaps and entanglements of its earthly environments."

== Ninigret ==
Yandell produced a sculpture of Ninigret, a 17th-century sachem of the eastern Niantic tribe, which was erected in 1914 in the seaside town of Watch Hill, Rhode Island. The sculpture was commissioned by Frances Canby Griscom (Biddle) in memory of her husband Clement Acton Griscom, a 19th-century shipping magnate. Ninigret is portrayed holding a fish in each hand. The sculpture was originally part of a water fountain for the village horses: water flowed from the mouths of the fishes into a trough.

The statue was moved several times; during the 1950s, it was painted gold and stood in front of the library. In 2016 the statue was moved to the north end of Village Park on Bay Street in Watch Hill, facing the harbor. The fountain was restored with a new pump, and for the first time in 65 years water once again flows out of the mouths of the two fish held by the chief.

== Social activism ==
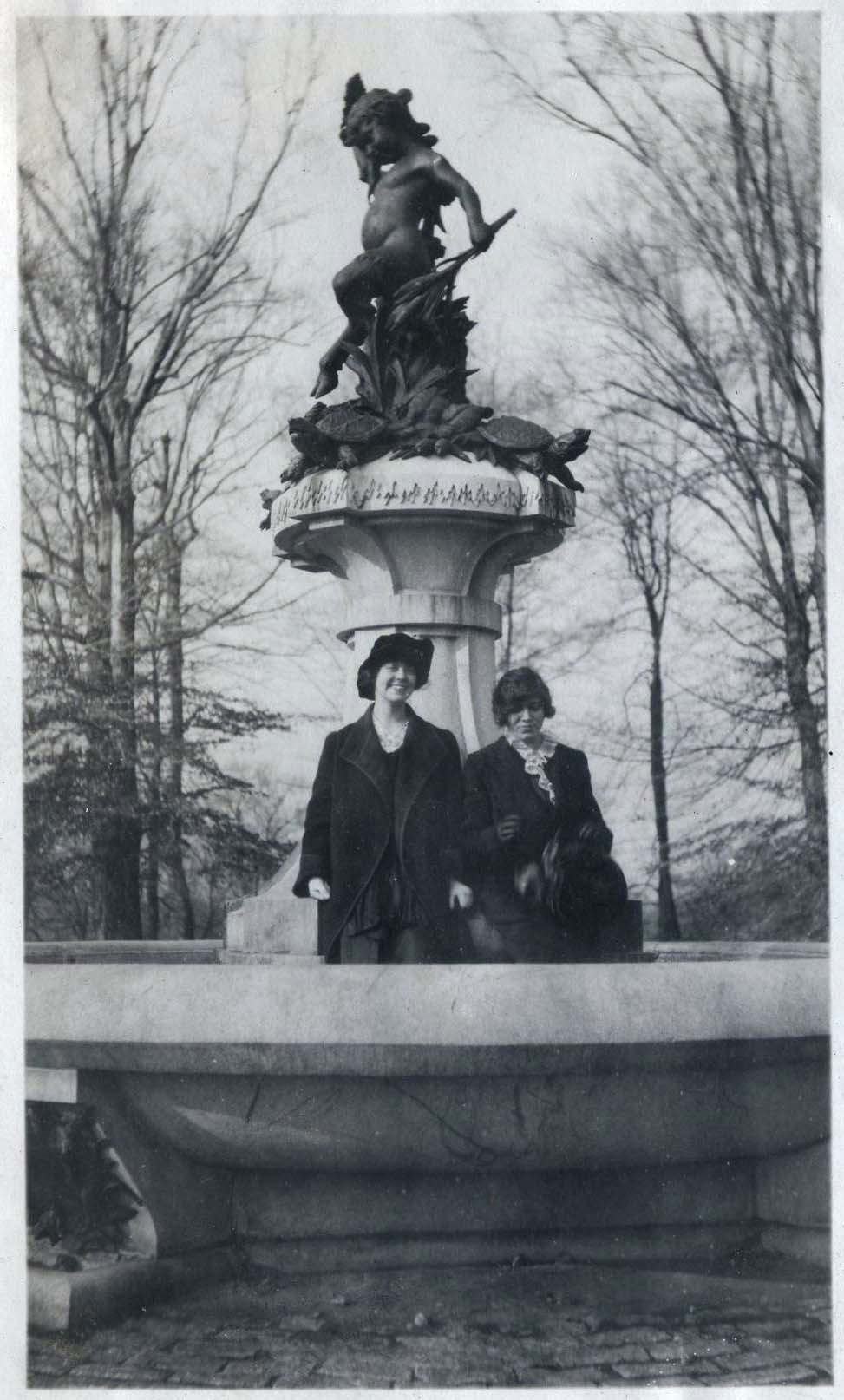
Hogan Fountain Ca. 1915

In addition to her work as an artist, Yandell was committed to improving the lives of others. She contributed to the education of future artists by founding in 1908 the Branstock School in Edgartown on Martha's Vineyard in Massachusetts. The art school functioned for several summers until her death in 1934. Yandell also worked with Appui Aux Artists, an organization which provided affordable meals for those involved in the arts and their families.

Yandell was an active supporter of women's suffrage, offering her art in exhibits for fundraising efforts. She also campaigned for Calvin Coolidge in Massachusetts when he ran for office on a pro-woman suffrage platform in the early 1900s.

During World War I, Enid Yandell became involved with the Red Cross, and with a French organization for the care of war orphans, La Société des Orphelins de la Guerre. After returning to the United States, she served as director of the Bureau of Communications for the American Red Cross in New York, and as chair of the Women's Committee for the Council of National Defense. These activities consumed almost all her time; she largely gave up her work as a sculptor to help others.

== Death ==
Enid Yandell died in Boston on June 12, 1934. She was buried in Louisville, Kentucky, at the Cave Hill Cemetery. In 2019 Cave Hill Cemetery is part of a Louisville-wide celebration of the legacy of Enid Yandell as a sculptor, social activist, and suffrage leader. The collaboration, known as Enid Yandell: A Life of Art and Activism, involves an array of Louisville cultural and historical institutions and artists to present a comprehensive study of Yandell on the 150th anniversary of her birth.

== Additional resources ==
- Caldwell, Désirée (1982). Enid Yandell and the Branstock School. Providence, R.I.: Museum of Art, Rhode Island School of Design.
- Decker, Juilee (2015). "Kentucky's Frontier Sculptor and "Bachelor Maid"". In McEuen, Melissa A.; Appleton, Thomas H. (eds.). Kentucky Women: Their Lives and Times. Athens: University of Georgia Press. pp. 196–218.
- Dennison, Mariea Caudill (2003–2004). "Babies for Suffrage: The Exhibition of Painting and Sculpture by Women Artists for the Benefit of the Woman Suffrage Campaign". Woman's Art Journal. 24 (2): 26. doi:10.2307/1358783. JSTOR 1358783.
- Opitz, Glenn B. (1986). Mantle Fielding's Dictionary of American Painters, Sculptors & Engravers. Poughkeepsie, NY: Apollo Books.
- Rubinstein, Charlotte Streifer (1990). American Women Sculptors. Boston, Mass.: G.K.Hall & Co. ISBN 9780816187324.
