= Ménie Muriel Dowie =

British writer

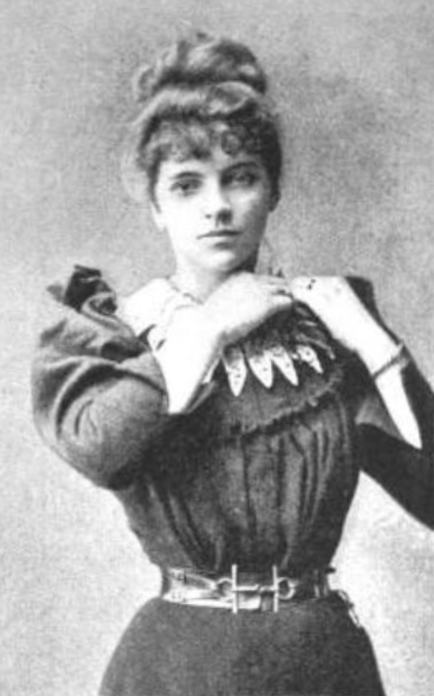
In The Sketch, 6 March 1895

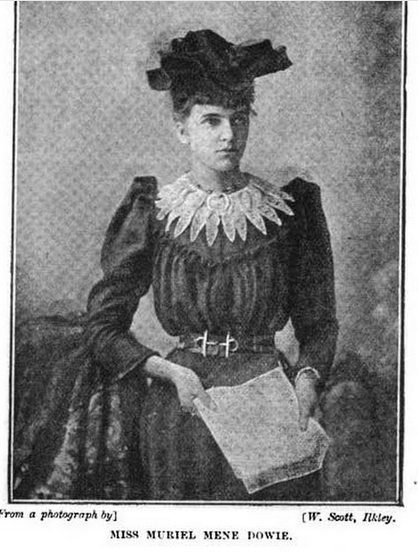
In an 1890 publication

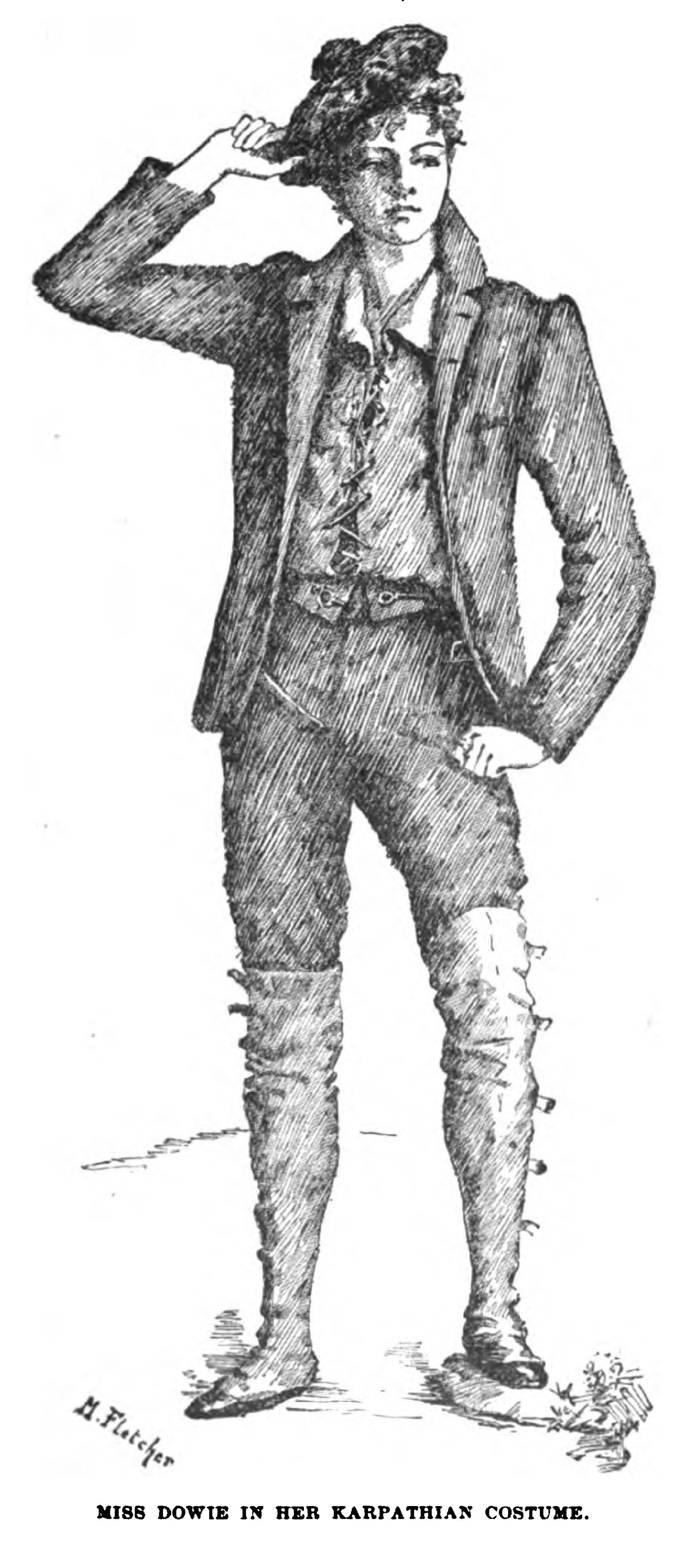

Ménie Muriel Dowie (15 July 1866 – 25 March 1945) was a British writer.

== Early life and education ==
Dowie was born in Liverpool to Annie Dowie (née Chambers) and James Muir Dowie, a merchant. Dowie's maternal grandfather was a Scottish author and a publisher, Robert Chambers.

Educated in Liverpool, Stuttgart, and France, she spent her early twenties travelling. Her best-known tour, in the summer of 1890, was through the Carpathian Mountains, where she travelled alone and on horseback. Her travelogue, A Girl in the Karpathians, was published the following year, and she lectured to packed audiences.

She lived for a time with Lillias Campbell Davidson, American founder of the British Lady Cyclists' Association, and Alice Werner, later a professor of Swahili and Bantu languages. According to the New York Times:

The writer Ethel F. Heddle novelized their experience in her 1896 book, "Three Girls in a Flat", in which she described the ambivalent experience when the freedom of living alone collides with "the sordid, matter-of-fact worries incident on having very little money".

(This book is not to be confused with one of the same title published in Chicago immediately before it hosted World's Columbian Exposition in 1893. Enid Yandell was one of a group of women sculptors known as the White Rabbits, who were asked at the last minute to complete the numerous statues and other architectural embellishments. Yandell co-wrote a semi-autobiographical account of her involvement in planning the fair.)

In 1891, Dowie married a journalist who was also a travel writer, Henry Norman, and over the next years travelled extensively with him. Their son, Henry Nigel St Valery Norman, was born in 1897.

== Writing career ==
In 1895, her first novel, Gallia, was published. It caused some controversy concerning its depiction of sexual relationships and clearly marked Dowie as one of the New Woman writers. Her contemporary, English novelist George Gissing, considered the novel "not at all a bad book". Apart from other occasional writing, she published two more novels, The Crook of the Bough (1898), a satirical story describing contemporary attitudes to women in Turkey, and Love and His Mask (1901), about the Boer War.

== Divorce and later life ==
In 1903, Henry Norman divorced her, causing a scandal by publicly accusing her of adultery with mountaineer Edward Fitzgerald. Dowie withdrew from the literary scene and married Fitzgerald later that year. Their marriage was childless. Years of extensive travel followed.

in 1915, Henry Norman was made a Baronet. Though divorced from Dowie, their son had been born during the term of the marriage, and thus became heir to the baronetcy on Norman's death in 1939.

In England, Dowie settled down on a farm and became a well-known cattle breeder, exhibiting pedigree Red Poll at shows around England and exporting livestock to Mombasa, Kenya.

Dowie separated from Fitzgerald in 1928, and the latter died in 1931. Suffering from asthma, and also believing that Great Britain was going to lose the war, Dowie emigrated to the United States in 1941. In 1943 her son, by then Sir Henry Nigel St Valery Norman, 2nd Baronet, an Air Commodore in the Auxiliary Air Force (Reserve) and a father of three, was killed in an aircraft accident, aged 45.

Dowie died at her home in Tucson, Arizona on 25 March 1945.
