= Henry Moss (exhibitee) =

18th-century Virginian man exhibited for vitiligo

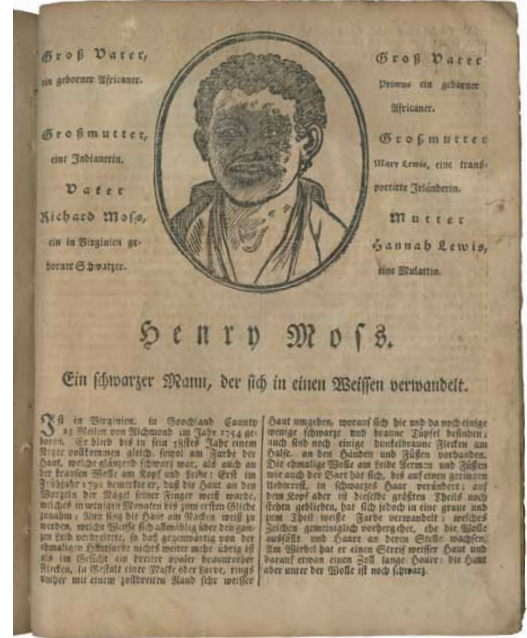
- Portrait of Henry Moss, published in Americanischer Stadt Und Land Calender Auf Das 1797ste Jahr Christi (Philadelphia: Carl Cist, 1796). From the Library Company of Philadelphia.

Henry Moss (c. 1754 – after 1796) was a man of African descent from Virginia whose progressive depigmentation (a condition now identified as vitiligo) attracted widespread public and scientific interest in the United States during the 1790s. In 1796 he began exhibiting his dramatically changing complexion for a fee in Philadelphia, both in taverns and before members of the American Philosophical Society, and quickly became a widely discussed public curiosity. His case drew commentary from prominent figures such as Benjamin Rush, Benjamin Smith Barton, Samuel Stanhope Smith, and Charles Caldwell, who used it in debates about race, disease, environment, and national identity.

== Early life ==
Details about Henry Moss's early life remain uncertain. Contemporary accounts differ considerably: some describe him as having been enslaved in Virginia (with claims that he later purchased his freedom), while others insist he was freeborn and a veteran of the American Revolutionary War. Most sources agree that he worked as a farmer before developing widespread depigmentation of his skin in the early 1790s. Moss first noticed small white patches on his hands around 1792, when he was about 38 years old. Over the next four years the depigmentation spread to his arms, legs, and face, giving him the outward appearance of a white man. By the summer of 1796, his transformation had become widely known.

== Public exhibitions in Philadelphia ==
In mid-1796, Moss began charging admission to display his changing skin color to the public. He first exhibited himself in Philadelphia taverns – notably at Mr. Leech's Tavern – where shows reportedly lasted up to twelve hours a day. In the shows, he would describe his life story as he removed clothing in order to display his vitiligo. He charged 25 cents per person, which at the time was a relatively high price.

He also appeared before members of the American Philosophical Society, attracting the attention of leading physicians and natural philosophers of the city. A surviving handbill titled A Great Curiosity advertised his daily appearances at Mr. Leech's Tavern, noting that Moss's hair was falling out and being replaced with straighter hair “similar to that of a white person.” According to physician Charles Caldwell, Moss's name during that time became “as well known to periodical readers as that of John Adams, Thomas Jefferson, or James Madison.” The same handbill included a certificate (dated 1794) from Captain Joseph Holt identifying him as “Harry Moss,” confirming his earlier dark complexion, stating he was free born, and noting he had served as a soldier during the Revolutionary War. It was reported that even George Washington attended Moss's exhibition to see this “great curiosity” in person.Other famous viewers of his show included Samuel Stanhope Smith and Benjamin Rush.

Moss's popularity in Philadelphia soon prompted him to take his show on the road. Later in 1796, and over the next few years, he toured several other American cities where he also drew crowds of curious onlookers. The income he earned from these exhibitions may have significantly improved his circumstances (and, according to some accounts, funded his emancipation).

== Experimentation by Charles Caldwell ==
In 1796, Charles Caldwell began to conduct experiments on Moss. Caldwell alleged that Moss entered into this arrangement willingly, but researcher Harriet A. Washington has disputed this narrative. Caldwell falsely claimed in an 1855 memoir that Moss' skin regained its dark color.

His experiments included instructing Moss to exercise intensively and closely examining his perspiration, as well as keeping detailed records of the rate of change of Moss' skin color.

Moss did not return to public exhibition after parting ways with Caldwell, and it is unclear what happened in his later life.

== Scientific and public reactions ==
Moss's unusual condition and public displays generated widespread discussion in both scientific circles and the popular press. Writers and physicians in Philadelphia (and beyond) examined Moss directly and debated the meaning of his changing skin in relation to environment, heredity, and human identity. Members of the American Philosophical Society discussed his case, and newspapers relayed accounts that linked his transformation to broader questions about slavery and freedom in the new republic. Benjamin Rush suggested that Moss's depigmentation might be a form of leprosy curing him of “the Black color” of Africans, while botanist Benjamin Smith Barton classified it as a separate medical condition he termed Leucaethopia humana (meaning “white condition of humans”). Samuel Stanhope Smith cited Moss's case in his writings to argue that racial differences were not fixed traits but the result of environmental factors, using Moss as evidence that skin color could change under certain conditions. Charles Caldwell emphasized the medical significance of the case, documenting it in clinical terms for the Transactions of the APS.

Reports of Moss's dramatic transformation spread widely through newspapers and periodicals, reaching a broad audience. Contemporaries even raised legal and social questions – for instance, if an enslaved person's visible “blackness” disappeared, how could one prove the person's slave status? This question was sharpened by news of the ongoing Haitian Revolution (1791–1804), which had already unsettled slaveholders with its implications of Black freedom and upheaval.

== Freedom and social position ==
Moss's public prominence also made his personal status a subject of debate. Some contemporaries (notably Rev. Samuel S. Smith) asserted that Moss had been a slave who purchased his freedom with the money he earned by exhibiting himself. In this version of events, the spectacle of white curiosity quite literally enabled an enslaved man to buy his freedom. By contrast, other accounts – including the Philadelphia broadside – described him as freeborn (and even a war veteran) from the start. Benjamin Rush, for example, described Moss as a slave in his 1799 article, while the advertisement Rush preserved contradicted this by claiming Moss “was free born.” These conflicting narratives about Moss's social position reflected broader late 18th-century debates over race, freedom, and citizenship in the early United States.

== Cultural legacy ==
Henry Moss's transformation was frequently invoked in early national discussions of race, science, and human variability. His case provided tangible evidence for American writers and natural philosophers to advance or contest theories about environmental influence, heredity, and the mutability of racial categories. Beyond medical or scientific interest, Moss's public exhibitions fueled a popular fascination with whiteness as a symbol of freedom and social belonging in the new nation. The image of a Black man turning white resonated with Enlightenment-era ideas about the “plasticity” of human traits. Contemporaries interpreted his case within wider Enlightenment debates linking race and environment, drawing on the classificatory frameworks of figures such as Carl Linnaeus, Buffon, and Blumenbach. In the years following Moss's exhibitions, his story continued to be cited by various authors (scientific and popular alike) as a curiosity and as a data point in racial theories of the time.

== See also ==
- Vitiligo
- Racial science
- American Philosophical Society
- Benjamin Rush
- Haitian Revolution
