= Gallia (novel) =

1895 novel by Ménie Muriel Dowie

- Author: Ménie Muriel Dowie
- Language: English
- Publication date: 1895

Gallia is an 1895 novel written by Ménie Muriel Dowie. It is usually categorised as a New Woman novel.

== Plot introduction ==
Set mainly in 1890s London and rural Surrey, Gallia is about a conventional aristocratic family with an unconventional daughter, who is the eponymous heroine of the story. However, Gallia does not openly rebel against society by, say, demanding equal rights for women or by deliberately breaking social rules. Rather, she leads a quiet, inconspicuous life, outwardly conforming to all the norms she is expected to observe. Her unconventionality is expressed in her unusual thoughts and ideas, in particular on human reproduction, which are given broad scope by the narrator. Thus, Gallia can be read as a philosophical novel.

== Plot summary ==
Ever since their only child, Gallia, decided to pursue a university education five years ago, Lord and Lady Hamesthwaite have noticed her growing distance from their traditional way of life. They quietly wonder whether she will ever agree to marry one of the eligible young men introduced to the family. Gallia is attractive, healthy, and intelligent, yet she rarely displays the easygoing, flirtatious manner expected by those around her. Her independent personality and unconventional conversational choices often surprise family and friends, particularly when she brings up subjects such as politics and sexuality during polite social gatherings.

Since her Oxford days, Gallia has known Hubert Essex, who has embarked on an academic career and does research on Darwinian theory. It is Essex with whom Gallia genuinely falls in love. Her honesty compels her to confess her love for him, and she is devastated when she is rejected by Essex. When he tells her bluntly that his "life has no need of" her, Gallia knows that she will never be able to experience romantic love again. What Essex omits from his speech is the fact that he is suffering from a hereditary heart condition and that he is very likely to die young.

When Gallia is introduced to Mark Gurdon, an ambitious social climber who wants to get ahead within the British Civil Service, and when she realizes that he is handsome, healthy, and virile, she chooses him to be the father of her future child, or children. Gurdon, whose guiding principle in life is decency, is keeping a mistress in a studio flat in London who resorts to a self-induced abortion to terminate a pregnancy just at the time when Gurdon starts being attracted by Gallia. But Gallia does not mind: when he proposes to her, she accepts but makes it clear right from the start that she will never be able to love him.

== Eugenicist thought in Gallia ==
Gallia Hamesthwaite expounds her ideas on human reproduction, on "making better people" (i.e. eugenics), while having tea with her friend Margaret Essex—Hubert's sister—and a fashionable young woman called Gertrude Janion. Although she believes that her suggestion for social reform is utopian ("We shan't live to see the real advance"), she has worked it out in quite some detail:

"[...] How can we wonder that only one person in ten is handsome and well made, when you reflect that they were most likely haps of hazard, that they were unintended, the offspring of people quite unfitted to have children at all? There are people fitted, for instance, to be mothers, which every woman isn't; there are women fitted to bring up children, who may not be mothers. Think of this: a man may love a woman and marry her; they may be devoted to each other, and long for a child to bring up and to love; but the woman may be too delicate to run the risk. What are they to do? What would be the reasonable thing to do? Sacrifice the poor woman for the sake of a weakly baby? No, of course not, but get in a mother!"

Gallia sees such a development (surrogacy) as "only a step farther" from employing a wet nurse, which was common practice among the rich in the late Victorian era. (In George Moore's novel Esther Waters (1894), the eponymous heroine works as a wet nurse after the birth of her son while leaving him in the hands of a baby farmer.) Strangely, Gallia, called "a shrewd and hopeful saint" by the narrator, does not offer a more comprehensive social reform proposal. For example, she is not concerned with the plight of the lower classes; she does not even talk to her own domestic workers. ("Very seldom indeed had she occasion to address any of her servants, with the exception of her own footman and her maid. She was held in the awe with which all servants regard a mistress who is habitually unconscious of their existence.") Also, the female suffrage movement is not mentioned.

== Editions ==
- The first edition of 1895 was published in London by Methuen & Co.; a second edition followed the same year. Also, a U.S. edition was published in Philadelphia by J. B. Lippincott & Co.
- One hundred years later, Everyman's Library published a critical edition edited by Helen Small (J. M. Dent: London, 1995).
- Since May 2010, Gallia has also been available as a volume in the Historical Collection from the British Library.
- An online edition is available here.
