= Lunsford Yandell Jr. =

American physician (1837–1884)

Lunsford Pitts Yandell Jr.
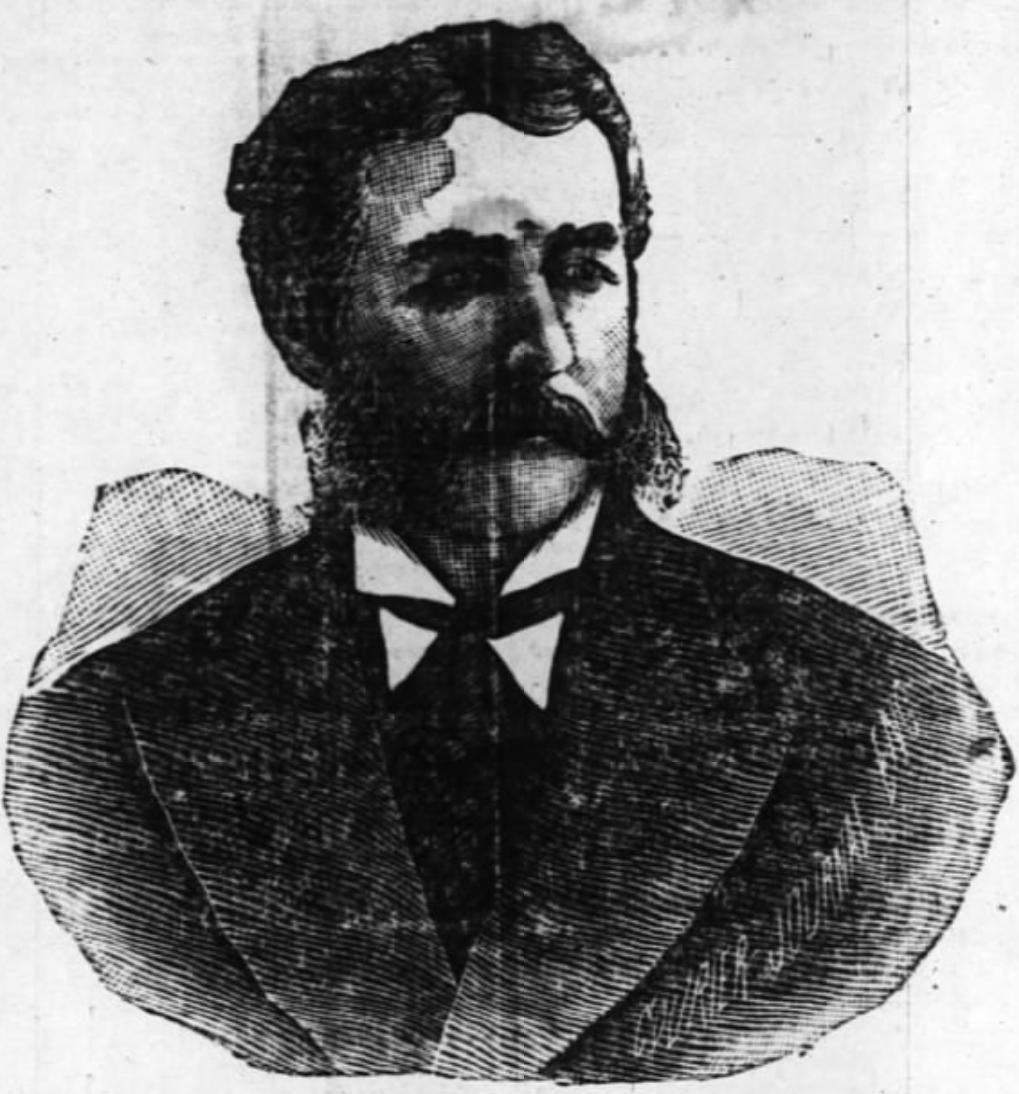
- Born: June 6, 1837; Rutherford County, Tennessee, U.S.
- Died: March 12, 1884 (aged 46); Louisville, Kentucky, U.S.
- Resting place: Cave Hill Cemetery; Louisville, Kentucky, U.S.
- Education: University of Louisville School of Medicine (M.D.)
- Occupations: Memphis Medical College (1859–1861); University of Louisville School of Medicine (1867–1884)
- Spouse: Louisa Elliston (m. 1866)
- Children: 4, including Enid Yandell
- Father: Lunsford Yandell
- Relatives: David Wendel Yandell (brother)
- Military career
- Allegiance: Confederate States of America
- Branch: Confederate States Army
- Service years: 1861–1865
- Rank: Staff Surgeon and Medical Director of the Corps
- Unit: 4th Tennessee Infantry Regiment
- Conflicts: American Civil War; Battle of Belmont; Battle of Island Number Ten; Battle of Shiloh

Lunsford Pitts Yandell Jr. (June 6, 1837 – March 12, 1884) was an American medical doctor and professor at Memphis Medical College and the University of Louisville School of Medicine. He served as a surgeon in the Confederate States Army during the American Civil War.

== Early life ==
Lunsford Pitts Yandell Jr. was born on June 6, 1837, at his father's plantation "Craggy Bluff" in Rutherford County, Tennessee. His parents were Susan Juliet (née Wendel) of Murfreesboro, Tennessee and Dr. Lunsford Pitts Yandell. His father was a physician, geologist and chemist. At a young age, Yandell and his family moved to Louisville, Kentucky. His father had accepted a job at Transylvania University. His father was one of the founders of the University of Louisville and taught there.

Yandell was a pupil of Professor Noble Butler. Yandell attended the University of Louisville School of Medicine. He pursued his clinical studies with his brother, David Wendel Yandell, at the Louisville City Hospital and Stokes's Dispensary. He graduated with a Doctor of Medicine in 1857.

== Career ==
=== Early career ===
Following graduation in 1857, Yandell practiced medicine with his brother and father for two years in Louisville. In April 1859, Yandell moved to Memphis, Tennessee and set up an office in the Gayoso House Hotel. He started a medical practice and was elected in 1859 to the Professorship of Materia Medica and Therapeutics in the Memphis Medical College. In 1859, Yandell's father left the University of Louisville and joined Yandell at the Memphis Medical College in 1860.

=== Civil War ===
Yandell joined the Shelby Grays, a local militia group in Memphis, after the Battle of Fort Sumter in 1861. On May 4, 1861, Yandell enlisted in the Confederate States Army as a private in the 4th Tennessee Infantry Regiment. His company was assigned to the command of General Gideon Pillow and Yandell protested this posting by applying to be a surgeon. He passed his tests. He fought in the Battle of Belmont. He was then commissioned as a surgeon by General Leonidas Polk. He fought in the Battles of Island Number Ten and Shiloh. He was complimented for his gallantry in the Battle of Shiloh and was promoted by General William Hardee to staff surgeon and medical director of the corps. He served in this role under Hardee from April 1862 until he was paroled at the end of the war on April 15, 1865, in North Carolina.

=== Medical career ===
After the war, Yandell moved back to Louisville to practice medicine. He spent a year abroad in Europe to study at medical centers there. While there, he attended the International Medical Congress in Paris. In 1867, he was elected Professor of Materia Medica and Therapeutics and Clinical Medicine at the University of Louisville School of Medicine. He became a specialist in the treatment of skin diseases. He served as the chair at the Medical School from 1882 to 1884.

In 1877, Yandell became the co-editor of the Louisville Medical News publication with Cowling. He then became chief editor and kept that role for the remainder of his life.

== Personal life ==
Yandell married Louisa Elliston of Nashville on December 20, 1866. They had four children, including Lunsford Yandell III and Enid Yandell, a sculptor. His son, Lunsford, would become the president of Mohawk Mining Company.

Yandell was given the nickname "Lunny" by his family. Yandell died on March 12, 1884, in Louisville after suffering from a kidney infection. He is buried at Cave Hill Cemetery in Louisville.
