= Charles Caldwell (physician) =

American physician (1772–1853)

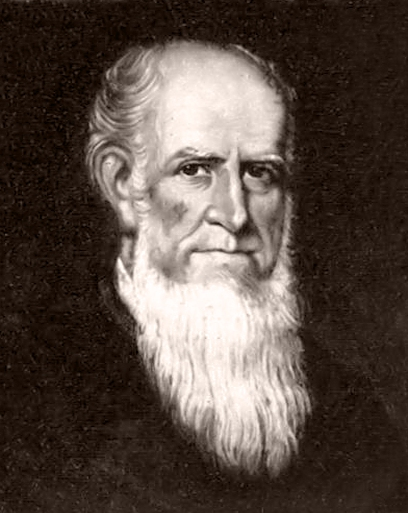
- Charles Caldwell, from his 1855 autobiography
- Born: May 14, 1772; Caswell County, North Carolina, U.S.
- Died: July 9, 1853 (aged 81); Louisville, Kentucky, U.S.
- Resting place: Cave Hill Cemetery; Louisville, Kentucky, U.S.
- Education: University of Pennsylvania School of Medicine (M.D.)
- Occupations: Physician; academic

Signature
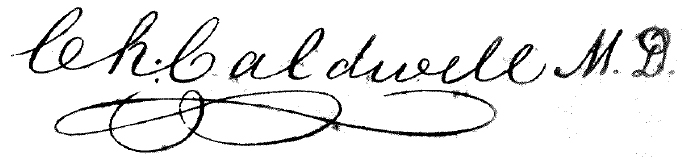

Charles Caldwell (May 14, 1772 – July 9, 1853) was an American medical doctor who is best known for starting what would become the University of Louisville School of Medicine and is one of the earliest proponents of Polygenism in the United States.

== Early life ==
Charles Caldwell was born on May 14, 1772, in Caswell County, North Carolina. His parents were Irish immigrants. Caldwell earned an M.D. from the University of Pennsylvania School of Medicine in 1796 while studying under Benjamin Rush.

== Career ==
Caldwell practiced medicine in Philadelphia and was a lecturer at his alma mater, the University of Pennsylvania. He also edited the "Port Folio" (one of the day's primary medical magazines) and published over 200 medical publications.

Caldwell was elected a member of the American Antiquarian Society in 1815. A significant number of copies of Caldwell's 18th and 19th century publications, including copies of the Port folio, survive in the collections of the AAS. Other institutions holding original copies of Caldwell's publications include the United States National Library of Medicine, and Harvard's Francis A. Countway Library of Medicine.

In 1819, Caldwell left Philadelphia to join the fledgling medical school at Lexington, Kentucky's Transylvania University, where he quickly turned the school into the region's strongest. In 1821, he became a Francophile and convinced the Kentucky General Assembly to purchase $10,000 (~$313,700 in 2024) worth of science and medical books from France, many of which are still held at the university. Despite his success, his "abrasive" and "arrogant" temperament created enemies at Transylvania. The university's medical program would fold soon afterwards. The school dismissed him in 1837, and he then traveled with several colleagues to Louisville, where they created the Louisville Medical Institute. As at Transylvania, he made the new school an instant success, with its rapid growth into one of the region's best medical schools. However, he was forced out in 1849 due to a personal rivalry with Lunsford Yandell.

Caldwell was one of the earliest supporters of polygenism in America. Caldwell attacked the position that environment was the cause of racial differences and argued instead that four races, Caucasian, Mongolian, American Indian, and Africans, were four different species, created separately by God. Caldwell was one of the earlier of the U.S. physicians who argued for polygenism; his work was subsequently cited by Josiah Nott in Types of Mankind, and he was followed by physicians such as Samuel Henry Dickson and John Edwards Holbrook. Caldwell used his theories to defend the institution of slavery in the United States and owned domestic slaves himself.

== Death ==
Caldwell died on July 9, 1853, Louisville, Kentucky. He was buried at Cave Hill Cemetery in Louisville.

== Selected works ==
- An attempt to establish the original sameness of three phenomena of fever (1796)
- A semi-annual oration, on the origin of pestilential diseases (1799)
- An eulogium to the memory of Dr. Samuel Cooper (1799)
- Medical & physical memoirs: containing, among other subjects, a particular enquiry into the origin and nature of the late pestilential epidemics of the United States (1801)
- An oration on the causes of the difference, in point of frequency and force, between the endemic diseases of the United States of America, and those of the countries of Europe (1802)
- An eulogium to the memory of Mr. George Lee (1802)
- An essay on the pestilential or yellow fever: as it prevailed in Philadelphia in the year eighteen hundred and five (1807)
- An anniversary oration on the subject of quarantines (1807)
- An eulogium on Caspar Wistar, M.D., professor of anatomy (1818)
- Outlines of a course of lectures on the institutes of medicine (1823)
- Elements of phrenology (1824)
- Introductory address on independence of intellect (1825)
- Thoughts on febrile miasms (1830)
- An address on the vice of gambling (1834)
- Thoughts on Physical Education, being a Discourse delivered to a Convention of Teachers in Lexington, KY. on the 6th and 7th of Nov., 1833 (1834).
- Thoughts on the spirit of improvement, the selection of its objects, and its proper direction (1835)
- Phrenology vindicated, and antiphrenology unmasked (1838)
- Autobiography of Charles Caldwell, M.D (1855)
