= Alice Werner =

German writer and teacher of Bantu languages

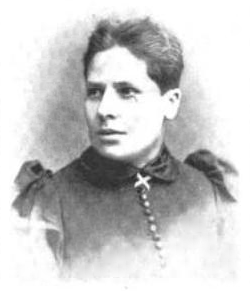
- In The Sketch, 20 February 1901
- Born: 26 June 1859; Trieste, Austrian Empire
- Died: 9 June 1935 (aged 75); Welwyn Garden City, England
- Occupations: Writer, educator
- Writing career
- Language: English
- Notable work: "Bannerman of Dandenong"

Alice Werner CBE (26 June 1859 – 9 June 1935) was a writer, poet and teacher of the Bantu languages.

== Life ==
Alice Werner was one of seven children in the family of Reinhardt Joseph Werner of Mainz, teacher of languages, and his wife, Harriett. Her father travelled extensively during the first fifteen years of her life, and she lived in New Zealand, Mexico, United States and throughout Europe, until the family settled in Tonbridge, England, in 1874.

After visiting Nyasaland in 1893 and Natal in 1894, her writings were focused on African themes.

In 1901 she began lecturing on Swahili at King's College London, becoming the school's only woman professor.

In 1917 she joined the School of Oriental Studies, moving up from lecturer to reader to professor of Swahili and Bantu languages, and retiring in 1929-1930. She was awarded a D.Litt. in 1928 from London University as a result of her specialised teaching and research. Following her retirement, she received the title of Emeritus Professor from the same university. In 1931 she was awarded the Silver Medal of the African Society, of which she was Vice-President, and also served as co-editor of Journal of the African Society.

Although not known as a major poet, her poem "Bannerman of Dandenong" has appeared in a number of important Australian poetry anthologies.

She lived for a time with Lillias Campbell Davidson, American founder of the British Lady Cyclists' Association, and Ménie Muriel Dowie, a British writer of the New Woman school. According to The New York Times:

The writer Ethel F. Heddle novelized their experience in her 1896 book, Three Girls in a Flat, in which she described the ambivalent experience when the freedom of living alone collides with "the sordid, matter-of-fact worries incident on having very little money."

She died in Welwyn Garden City on 9 June 1935.

== Works ==
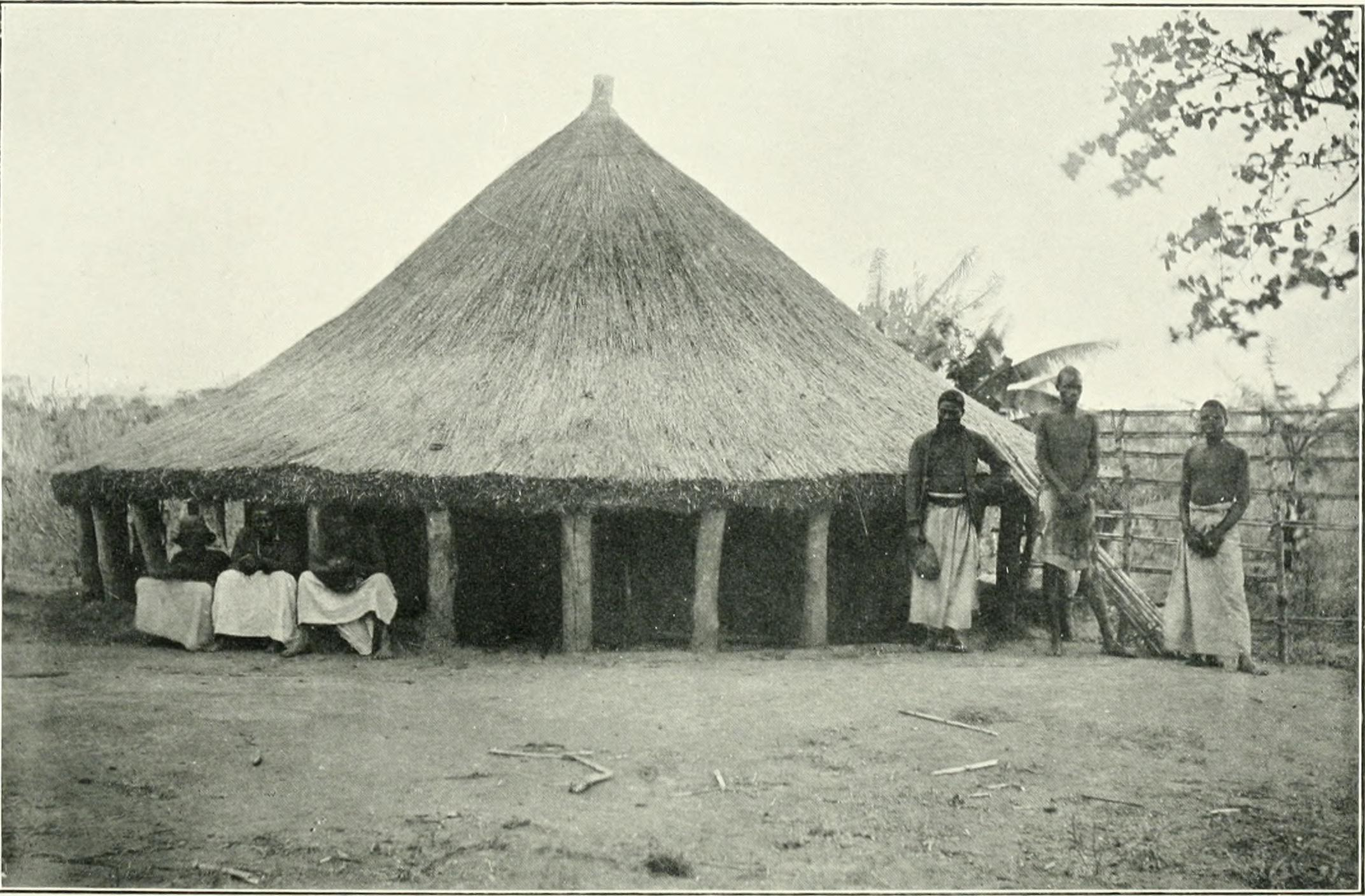
A photo in The natives of British Central Africa (1906)

- A Time and Times (poems) (1886)
- O'Driscoll's Weird (1892)
- The Humour of Italy (1892)
- The Humour of Holland (1893)
- The Captain of the Locusts (1899)
- Chapinga's While Man (1901)
- Native Races of British Central Africa (1906)
- "Introduction" to Jamaican Song and Story: Annancy Stories, Digging Sings, Ring Tunes, and Dancing Tunes, ed. Walter Jekyll (1906)
- The Language Families of Africa (1915)
- A Swahili History of Pate (1915)
- Introductory Sketch of the Bantu Languages (1919)
- The Swahili Saga of Liongo Fumo (1926)
- A First Swahili Book (1927; written with M. H. Werner)
- Swahili Tales (1929)
- Structure and Relationship of African Languages (1930)
- The Story of Miqdad and Mayasa (1932)
- Myths and Legends of the Bantu (1933)

== Archives ==
- The papers of Alice Werner are held at SOAS Archives. Digitised material from the collection can be viewed online here.
