= Lunsford Yandell =

American physician and educator (1805–1878)

Lunsford Pitts Yandell Sr.
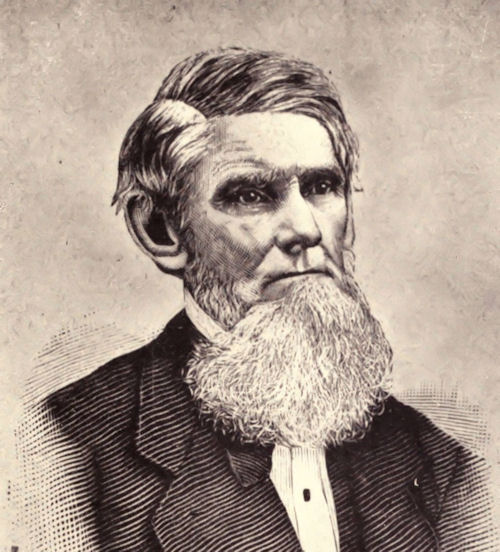
- Sketch of Yandell in 1905 publication
- Born: Lunsford Pitts Yandell; July 4, 1805; Hartsville, Tennessee, U.S.
- Died: February 4, 1878 (aged 72); Louisville, Kentucky, U.S.
- Education: Transylvania University
- Alma mater: University of Maryland
- Occupations: Physician; educator; writer; geologist; paleontologist; preacher
- Employer(s): Transylvania University (1831–1837); University of Louisville (1837–1859); Memphis Medical College (1859–1861)
- Spouse: Susan Wendel (m. 1825; died 1860)
- Children: 13, including Lunsford Jr. and David
- Relatives: Enid Yandell (granddaughter)
- Military career
- Allegiance: Confederate States of America
- Branch: Confederate States Army
- Conflicts: American Civil War

Lunsford Pitts Yandell Sr. (July 4, 1805 – February 4, 1878) was an American medical doctor, educator, geologist, paleontologist and preacher. He was one of the founders and first professors at the University of Louisville. He also taught at Transylvania University and the Memphis Medical College.

== Early life ==
Lunsford Pitts Yandell was born on July 4, 1805, in Hartsville, Tennessee to Elizabeth (née Pitts) and Dr. Wilson Yandell. His father practiced medicine in Hartsville and Murfreesboro, Tennessee. His grandfather, William Yandell, was from Mecklenburg County, North Carolina and served in the American Revolutionary War.

Yandell studied medicine under his father. He attended the 1822 to 1823 session at Transylvania University and would graduate from the University of Maryland in 1825. While at Transylvania University, he was taught by Charles Caldwell and they became friends.

== Career ==
Yandell practiced medicine for five years with his father in Murfreesboro until his father's death. In 1831, Yandell accepted the Chair of Chemistry in the medical department of Transylvania University in Lexington, Kentucky. The nomination for the job was influenced by his friend Charles Caldwell. In 1837, he moved to Louisville, Kentucky to become the founding dean of the University of Louisville. He served as Chair of Chemistry, but would later transfer to Chair of Physiology and Pathological Anatomy. The transfer to Chair of Physiology appealed to the interests of Yandell. Yandell replaced his friend Charles Caldwell in this role, which caused a rift between the two men in Caldwell's later years. He developed and directed the construction of the first medical building at the University of Louisville.

In 1859, Yandell resigned from the University of Louisville and moved to Memphis, Tennessee. He worked as a professor of Theory and Practice at the Memphis Medical College until it closed due to the American Civil War. Yandell briefly served in the medical corps of the Confederate States Army during the Civil War.

Yandell was a member of the Presbyterian Church and became licensed in 1862 as a preacher in Tennessee. In 1864, he was ordained the pastor of a church in Dancyville, Tennessee. He resigned his pastorship in 1867. In 1867, he returned to Louisville.

Yandell was the founding editor of the Western Journal of Medicine. He also worked as an editor for The Transylvania Medical Journal. He published works in history, biography, education, geology and paleontology. His works included the Contributions to the Geology of Kentucky (1847) with B. F. Shumard. He also published the article On the Distribution of the Crinoidea in the Western States about the class Crinoidea. He served as the president of the College of Physicians and Surgeons of Louisville in 1872 and president of the Medical Society of Kentucky the year he died.

== Works ==
- Contributions to the Geology of Kentucky (1847)

== Personal life ==
Yandell married Susan I. Wendel of Murfreesboro on October 18, 1825. They had thirteen children, but only three sons and a daughter survived infancy. Two sons became physicians, Lunsford Yandell Jr. and David Wendel Yandell. His wife died in 1860 from typhoid fever. He was married a second time.

Yandell died on February 4, 1878, of pneumonia at the house of his son Lunsford Jr. in Louisville.

== Awards and legacy ==
Yandell received a Master of Arts honorary degree from the University of Nashville in 1838.

Several fossils are named after Yandell.
