= David Wendel Yandell =

American physician (1826–1898)

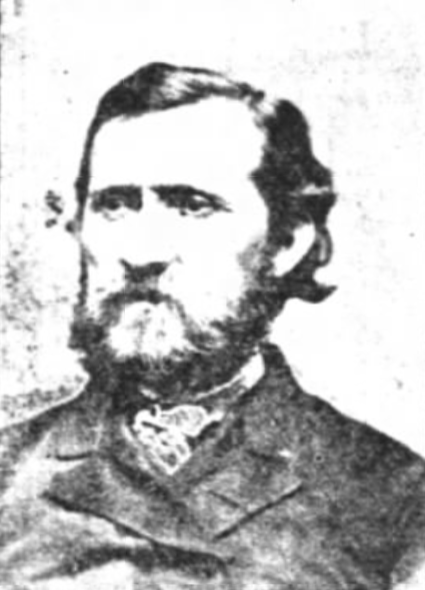
- Born: September 4, 1826; Murfreesboro, Tennessee, U.S.
- Died: May 2, 1898 (aged 71); Louisville, Kentucky, U.S.
- Resting place: Cave Hill Cemetery; Louisville, Kentucky, U.S.
- Education: Centre College; University of Louisville (M.D.)
- Occupations: Physician; soldier
- Spouse: Frances Jane Crutcher
- Children: 4
- Father: Lunsford Yandell
- Relatives: Lunsford Yandell Jr. (brother); Enid Yandell (niece)
- Military career
- Branch: Confederate States Army
- Unit: Army of the West
- Conflicts: American Civil War; Battle of Shiloh; Battle of Chickamauga

David Wendel Yandell (September 4, 1826 – May 2, 1898) was an American physician and soldier of the Confederate States Army in the American Civil War.

== Early life ==
Yandell was born on September 4, 1826, in Murfreesboro, Tennessee. He was the eldest child of Lunsford Yandell and Susan Wendel Yandell. His father was one of the founders of the University of Louisville's Medical Institute.

He attended Centre College and graduated with an M.D. from the University of Louisville in 1846. Subsequently, he studied in London and Paris.

== Career ==
Yandell was a distinguished author, teacher, and editor. He wrote several books, including The Microscopist, a Complete Manual on the Use of the Microscope, Curiosities of the Microscope, Physician's Pocket Dose and Prescription Book, and Agreement of Science and Revelation.

During the American Civil War, he served on General Albert Sidney Johnston’s staff as medical director of the Army of the West. He served in the battles of Shiloh, Murfreesboro, and Chickamauga. At Shiloh, he tended to Union as well as Confederate soldiers.

In 1867, he became chair of science and practice of medicine at the University of Louisville and, in 1869, he became chair of clinical surgery.

He was the co-founder and editor of the medical journal The American Practitioner, and was president of the American Medical Association in 1871. He also was president of the American Surgical Association

== Personal life ==
Yandell married Frances Jane Crutcher of Nashville, Tennessee. The couple had four children, including Mrs. W. O. Roberts, Mrs. James F. Buckner Jr. and William.

In the last years of his life, he suffered from arteriosclerosis and dementia. He died on May 2, 1898, at his home in Louisville. He was buried in Cave Hill Cemetery.

== Selected works ==
- The progress of medicine: an introductory lecture delivered in the University of Louisville, on the evening of October 4th, 1869
- Notes on medical matters and medical men in London and Paris
- A clinical lecture on the use of plastic dressing in fractures of lower extremity
- Pioneer surgery in Kentucky : a sketch
- Temperament: an address
