= Lance Yandell =

American football player (born 1970)

Lance R Yandell (born March 4, 1970) was a football wide receiver in Cleveland, Ohio. His career started out in Baldwin Wallace College where he set many records as a wide receiver. He then moved on to go to the Canadian Football League where he was drafted to the Baltimore Stallions. He then went on to play arena football and was on the Cleveland Thunderbolts from 1994 to 1995. He was one of there star wide receivers and line backers. He then moved on to the Memphis Pharaohs from 1996 to 1997. Lance then went on to the Cleveland Browns practice squad and was about to move onto the actual team but he had a career ending injury and required surgery.
