= Myths and Legends of the Bantu =

Book by Alice Werner published in 1933

- Title page for Myths and Legends of the Bantu (1932)
- Author: Alice Werner
- Language: English
- Subject: Mythology
- Genre: Non-fiction
- Publication date: 1933

Myths and Legends of the Bantu is a book by Alice Werner published in 1933. It contains legends and myths from the Bantu culture concerning the gods, the origin of mankind, the afterlife, the heroes and demigods, various creatures, real and mythical, as well as some of the great Bantu epics.
