= Lillias Campbell Davidson =

American-British writer and cycling activist (1853–1934)

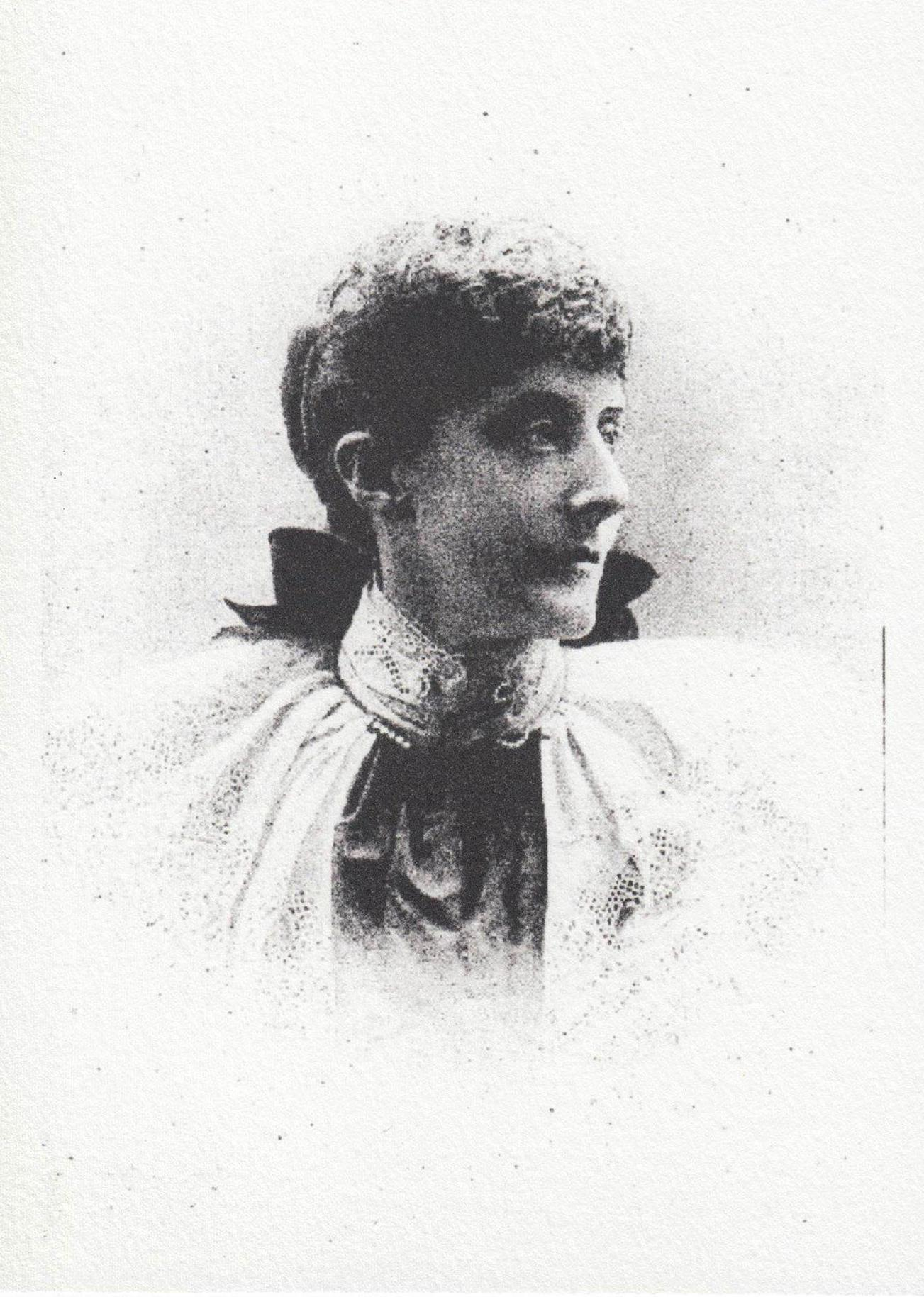
- Born: 1853; Brooklyn, New York
- Died: 1 March 1934 (aged 80–81); Southsea, Hampshire, England
- Occupation: writer
- Known for: advocacy for cycling and women's rights

Lillias Campbell Davidson (1853 – 1 March 1934) was an American-born British writer. She founded the Lady Cyclists' Association. In 2018, the New York Times published a belated obituary as part of its Overlooked series.

== Life ==
Lillias Campbell Davidson was born in Brooklyn in 1853.

Davidson started cycling in her later 20s, in the early 1880s, often in the early morning when streets were quiet to avoid social stigma. She once turned down a side street to avoid the local vicar seeing her cycling. She soon became more vocal, and encouraged other women to join her, writing women's columns for the Scottish Cyclist and the Cyclists’ Touring Club Gazette. In 1892, she founded the Lady Cyclists’ Association, and acted as its president for the next five years. She published her “Handbook for Lady Cyclists” in 1896 and encouraged women to wear more practical rational dress to make physical activity easier.

According to Elizabeth Robins Pennell, another American cyclist in London at the same time, Davidson was employed by Bicycling News and the Cyclists' Touring Club Gazette.

She lived for a time with Alice Werner, a teacher of Bantu, and Ménie Muriel Dowie, a British writer of the New Woman school. According to the New York Times:

The writer Ethel F. Heddle novelized their experience in her 1896 book, “Three Girls in a Flat,” in which she described the ambivalent experience when the freedom of living alone collides with “the sordid, matter-of-fact worries incident on having very little money.”

Davidson published 14 novels and many articles. She moved to Southsea and died on 1 March 1934.

== Works ==
=== Non-fiction ===
- Hints to Lady Travellers at Home and Abroad, Iliffe & Son: London, 1889. OCLC 559333779; London: Elliott and Thompson, 2011. ISBN 9781904027911, OCLC 712779100
- Handbook for Lady Cyclists, Hay Nisbett & Co, c.1896
- Catherine of Bragança: Infanta of Portugal and Queen-Consort of England, J Murray, 1908; (Classic Reprint), Forgotten Books, 2016 ISBN 1333381026

=== Fiction ===
- Houses of Clay, S W Partridge, 19-- OCLC 221860707
- Second Lieutenant Celia, Bliss Sands, 1898
- For Lack of Love, Horace Marshall & Son, 1900
- The Theft of a Heart, C Arthur Pearson, 1902
- The Confessions of a Matchmaking Mother, J F Taylor, 1902. ISBN 9781166235338
- Purple and Fine Linen, Ward, Lock & Co, 1916
- A Girl's Battle ... With six illustrations. London, 1933. OCLC 559333726

=== Serialised ===
- The Twentieth of June, 1887
- The Young Man from Chicago, 1900
- Thief and Heiress, 1911
- The Touchstone, 1912
- The Marriage Trap: The Story of a Woman's Sin and a Young Man's Folly, 1912
