= Lady Cyclists' Association =

The Lady Cyclists' Association was the United Kingdom's – and probably the world's – first cycling organisation expressly for women, set up to provide rides, tours and social gatherings for women cyclists.

== History ==
The association was established in 1892, 12 years after the admission of the first woman into the 'Bicycle Touring Club', later renamed the Cyclists' Touring Club. Its headquarters were at 35 Victoria Street, London. The annual membership fee was three shillings and sixpence.

It was affiliated to the National Cyclists' Union, which was a sporting rather than leisure organisation. Some of its members wore 'rational dress' and advocated women's right to wear comfortable clothing while cycling.

The organisation published a handbook (priced 4d), containing details of reasonably priced places to stay while cycle touring, and a monthly journal, the Lady Cyclists' Association News.

The founder and early driving force behind the association was Miss Lillias Campbell Davidson, who saw cycling as a path to the emancipation of women from restrictions imposed by society, opining that cycling offered "the greatest boon that has come to women for many a long day". Davidson was the author of the best-selling Hints to Lady Travellers (1889) and later the Handbook for Lady Cyclists (1896). She also wrote the ladies' column in the Cyclists' Touring Club Gazette.

== See also ==
- Cyclists' Touring Club (CTC)
- National Cyclists' Union
- Western Rational Dress Society
