= List of number-one singles of 2001 (Canada) =

The following lists the number one best-selling singles in Canada in 2001 which was published in Billboard magazine under the Hits of the World section. Only songs released as physical singles qualified for this chart during this time. During this period, the singles market in Canada was very limited in both scope and availability, and in many cases, these songs received little or no radio support. For tracks other than those by American Idol or Canadian Idol winners, sales were likely to be less than 1,000 per week. Nevertheless, this was the only singles chart Canadians had until June 2007, when the Canadian Hot 100 was released to the public. It also lists other big hits in the sales chart.

Note that Billboard publishes charts with an issue date approximately 7–10 days in advance.

== Chart history ==
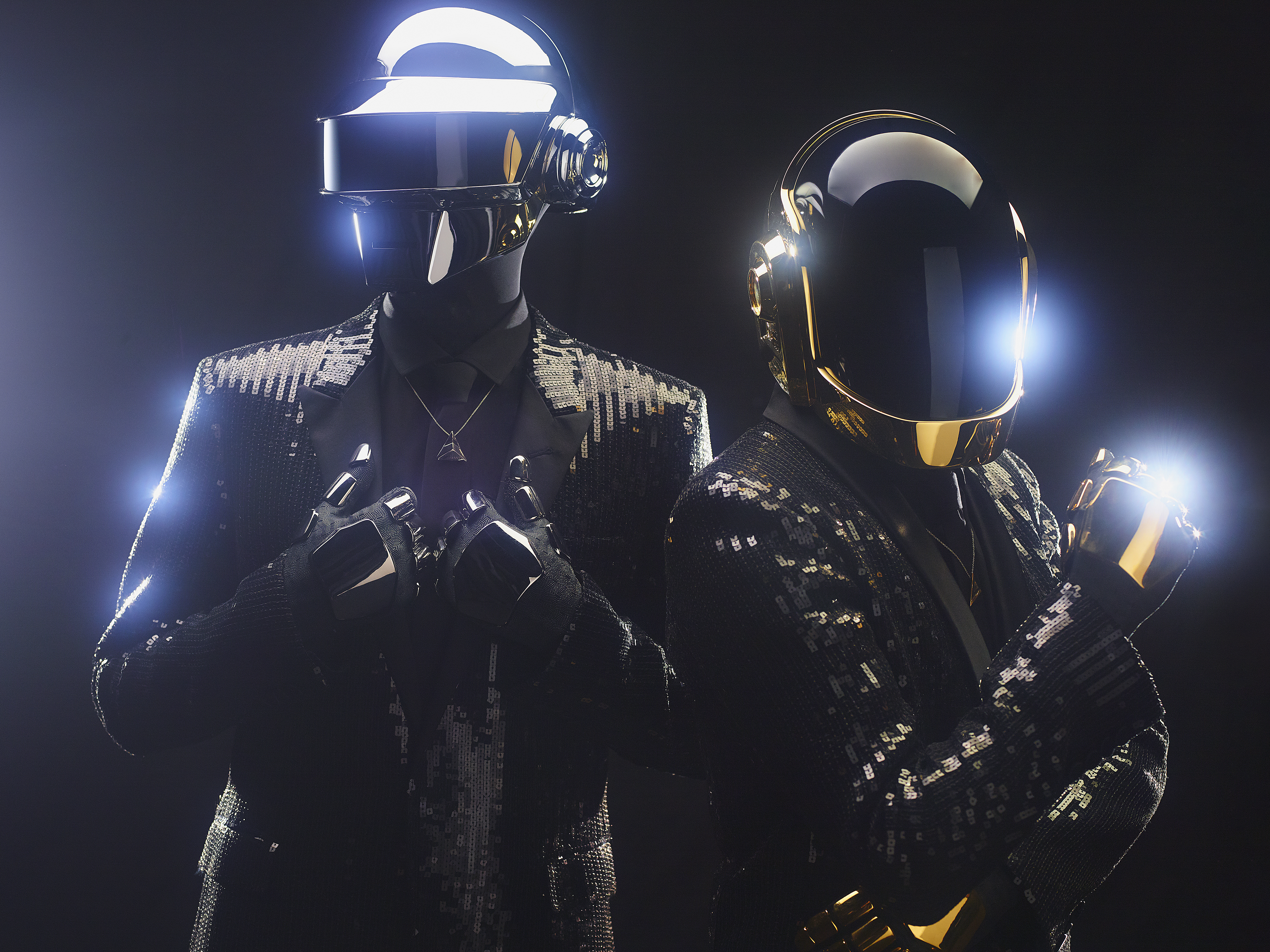
French duo Daft Punk scored their first Canadian number-one single with "One More Time" in January.

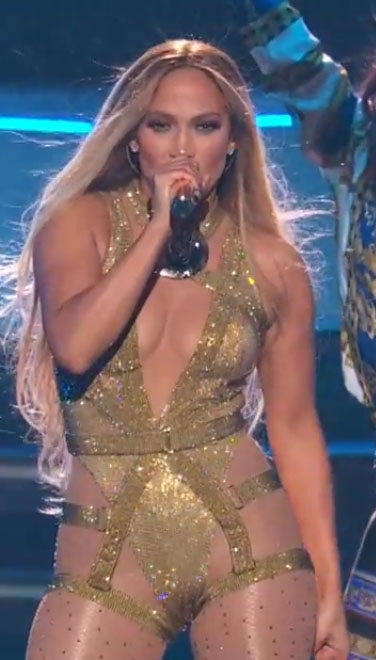
Jennifer Lopez scored her first number-one hit in the 2000s with "Love Don't Cost a Thing".

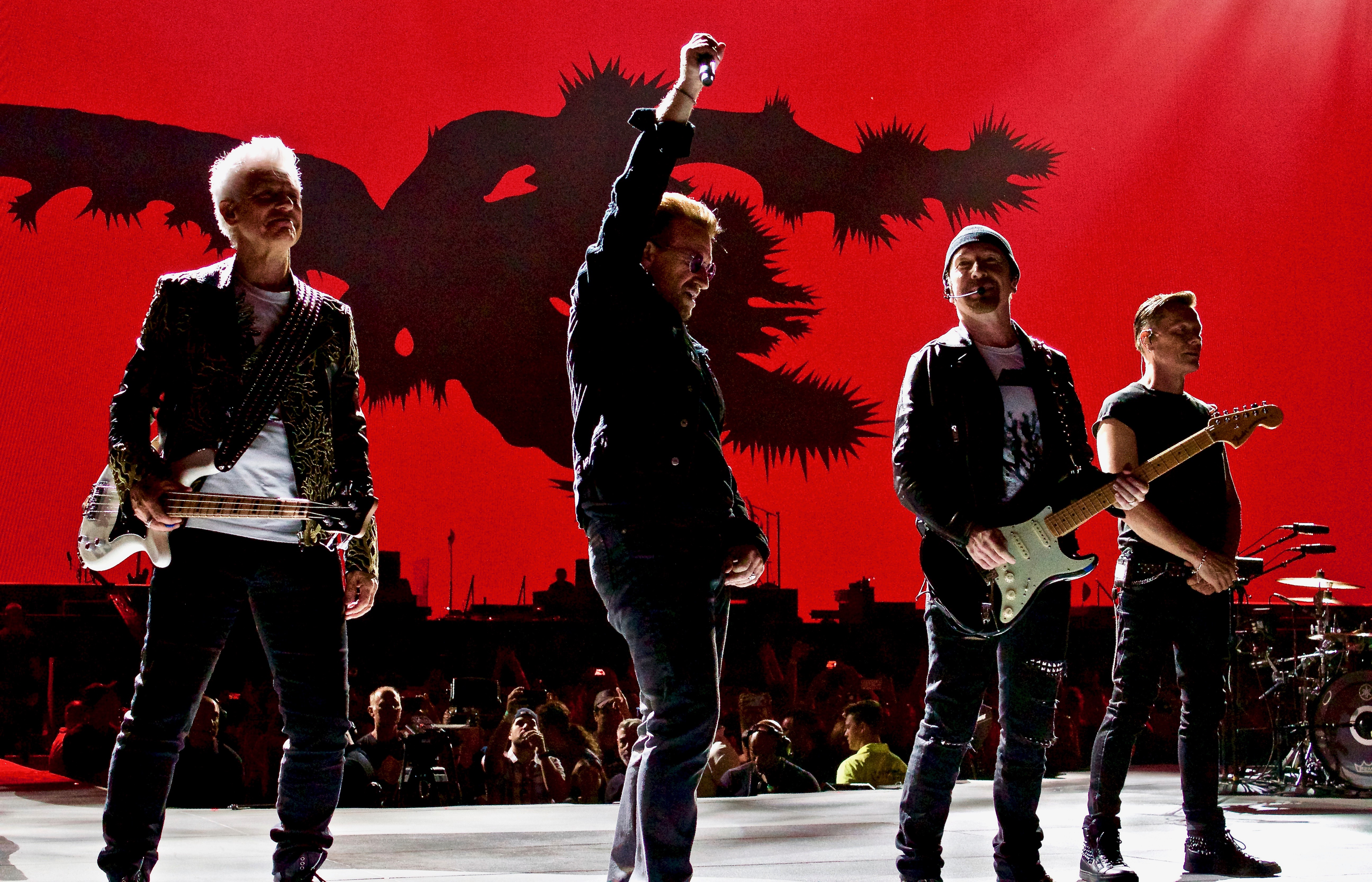
Irish band U2 received three-number one singles in 2001: "Walk On", "Elevation", and "Stuck in a Moment You Can't Get Out Of".

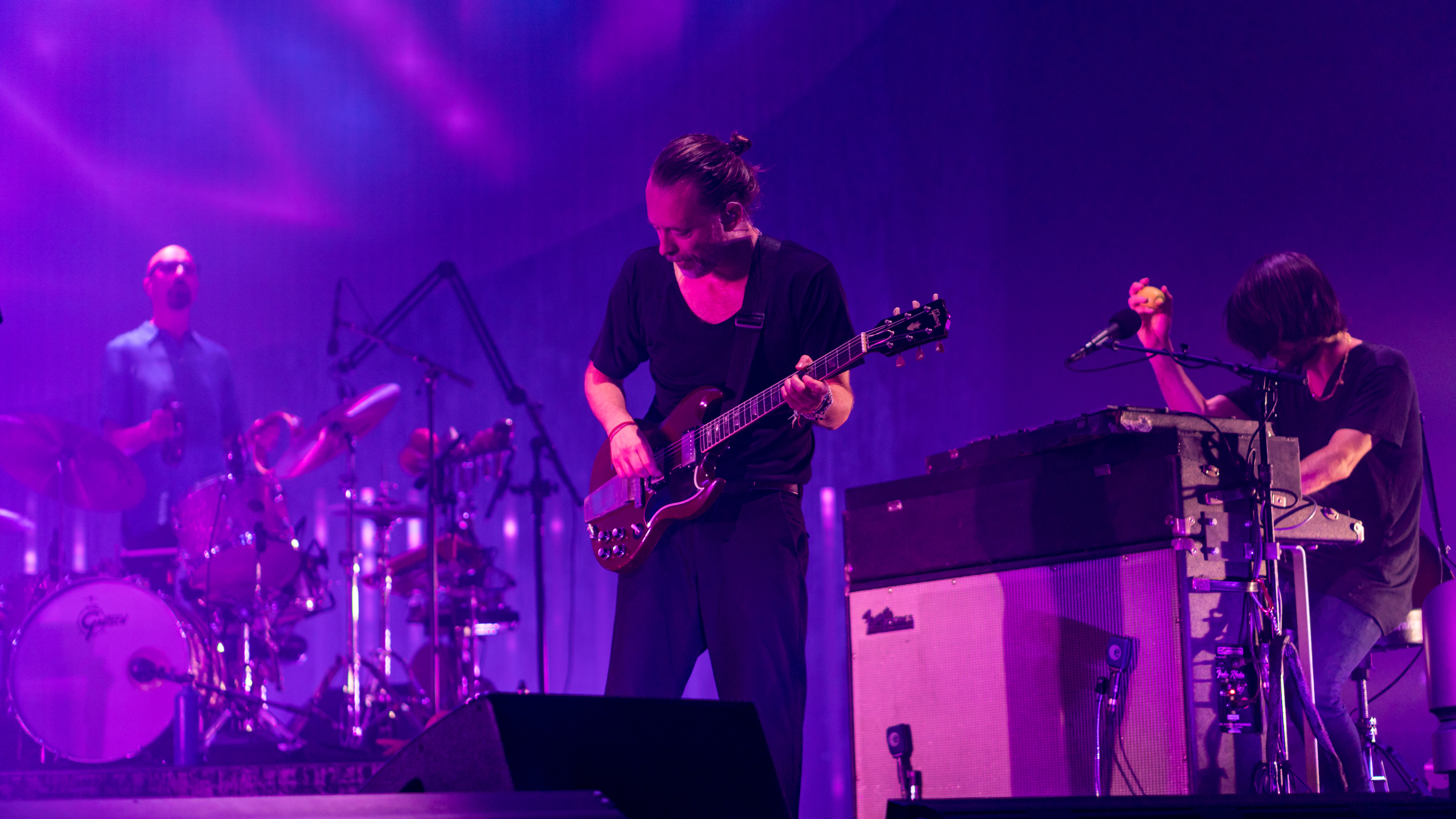
Radiohead spent four weeks at number one in September with "Knives Out".

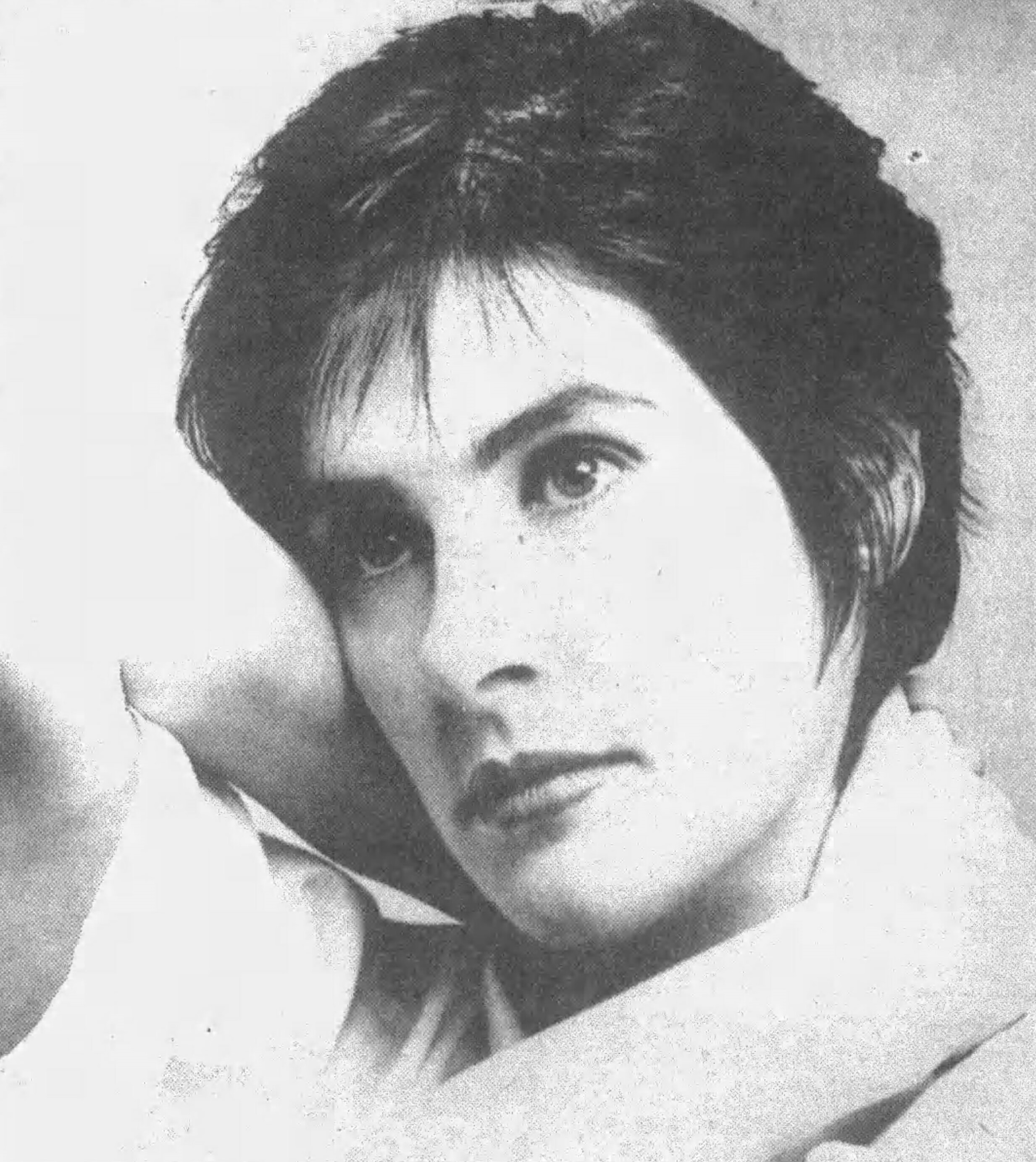
Enya ended the year at number one with "Only Time".

Issue date	Song	Artist(s)	Ref.
January 6	"Liquid Dreams"	O-Town	
January 13	"Sandstorm"	Darude	
January 20	"One More Time"	Daft Punk	
January 27	"One More Time"	Daft Punk	
February 3	"Love Don't Cost a Thing"	Jennifer Lopez	
February 10	"One More Time"	Daft Punk	
February 17	"Don't Tell Me"	Madonna	
February 24	"Sandstorm"	Darude	
March 3	"One More Time"	Daft Punk	
March 10	"Walk On"	U2	
March 17	"Walk On"	U2	
March 24	"Walk On"	U2	
March 31	"Walk On"	U2	
April 7	"Walk On"	U2	
April 14	"Walk On"	U2	
April 21	"All for You"	Janet Jackson	
April 28	"All for You"	Janet Jackson	
May 5	"Get Over Yourself"	Eden's Crush	
May 12	"Get Over Yourself"	Eden's Crush	
May 19	"Days Like That"	Sugar Jones	
May 26	"Days Like That"	Sugar Jones	
June 2	"Days Like That"	Sugar Jones	
June 9	"Days Like That"	Sugar Jones	
June 16	"Days Like That"	Sugar Jones	
June 23	"Days Like That"	Sugar Jones	
June 30	"Pop" (import)	NSYNC	
July 7	"Pop" (import)	NSYNC	
July 14	"Pop" (import)	NSYNC	
July 21	"Pop" (import)	NSYNC	
July 28	"Elevation" (import)	U2	
August 4	"Elevation"	U2	
August 11	"Elevation"	U2	
August 18	"Elevation"	U2	
August 25	"Elevation"	U2	
September 1	"There You'll Be"	Faith Hill	
September 8	"Knives Out"	Radiohead	
September 15	"Knives Out"	Radiohead	
September 22	"Knives Out"	Radiohead	
September 29	"Knives Out"	Radiohead	
October 6	"There You'll Be"	Faith Hill	
October 13	"Completely"	Serial Joe	
October 20	"Completely"	Serial Joe	
October 27	"There You'll Be"	Faith Hill	
November 3	"Completely"	Serial Joe	
November 10	"Hero"	Enrique Iglesias	
November 17	"Stuck in a Moment You Can't Get Out Of"	U2	
November 24	"Stuck in a Moment You Can't Get Out Of"	U2	
December 1	"I Won't Be Home for Christmas"	Blink-182	
December 8	"I Won't Be Home for Christmas"	Blink-182	
December 15	"I Won't Be Home for Christmas"	Blink-182	
December 22	"Only Time"	Enya	
December 29	"Only Time"	Enya	
