= Fidanza =

Fidanza is a surname. Notable people with the surname include:

- Giovanni Fidanza (born 1965), Italian cyclist
- Dominique Fidanza (born 1979), Belgian-Italian singer
