= Juno Awards of 2002 =

Canadian music awards ceremony

- Date: 13–14 April 2002
- Venue: Mile One Stadium, St. John's, NFLD
- Hosted by: Barenaked Ladies

Television/radio coverage
- Network: CTV

The Juno Awards of 2002 were presented in St. John's, Newfoundland and Labrador, Canada during the weekend of 13–14 April 2002.

Nominations were announced on 11 February 2002 at a news conference hosted by Mike Bullard. Awards for secondary categories were presented at a non-televised gala on 13 April.

The primary ceremony took place on 14 April at Mile One Stadium and was televised by CTV, marking the first time the private broadcaster carried the event. CBC Television had previously held the broadcast rights for the primary Juno ceremonies. The telecast was hosted by members of Barenaked Ladies and attracted the highest ratings in several years (approximately 1.4 million viewers).

Singer/pianist Diana Krall won awards in three categories based on her album The Look of Love. Nickelback also won three Junos on the strength of their album Silver Side Up, whose recording engineer won an additional Juno. Daniel Lanois was inducted into the Canadian Music Hall of Fame.

== Nominees and winners ==
=== Best Artist ===
Winner: Diana Krall

Other Nominees:

- Leonard Cohen
- Nelly Furtado
- Garou
- Amanda Marshall

=== Best New Solo Artist ===
Winner: Hawksley Workman

Other Nominees:

- Gabrielle Destroismaisons
- Jelleestone
- Maren Ord
- Thrust

=== Best Group ===
Winner: Nickelback

Other Nominees:

- Matthew Good Band
- Our Lady Peace
- Sum 41
- The Tea Party

=== Best New Group ===
Winner: Default

Other Nominees:

- Joydrop
- Smoother
- Sugar Jones
- Wave

=== Best Songwriter ===
Winner: Jann Arden, "Never Mind", "Thing for You" (with co-songwriter Russell Broom)

Other Nominees:

- Leonard Cohen, "Boogie Street", "In My Secret Life", "You Have Loved Enough" (all with co-songwriter Sharon Robinson)
- Sarah Harmer, "Don't Get Your Back Up", "Hideout", "Uniform Grey"
- Ron Sexsmith, "April After All" (by Elvis Costello and Anne Sofie von Otter), "Just My Heart Talking", "This Song"
- Rufus Wainwright, "Cigarettes and Chocolate Milk", "Grey Gardens", "Poses"

=== Best Country Artist/Group ===
Winner: Carolyn Dawn Johnson

Other Nominees:

- Paul Brandt
- Lisa Brokop
- Jimmy Rankin
- The Wilkinsons

=== Best New Country Artist/Group ===
Winner: The Ennis Sisters

Other Nominees:

- Steve Fox
- Aaron Lines
- J. R. Vautour
- Doc Walker

=== Best Producer ===
Winner: Daniel Lanois with co-producer Brian Eno, "Beautiful Day" and "Elevation" by U2

Other Nominees:

- Ben Dunk with co-producer Rick Neigher, "California" and "Think It Over" by Wave
- Justin Gray, "Days Like That" and "I Got U" by Sugar Jones
- Mark Makoway, "Alone in the Universe" and "Too Close to the Sun" by David Usher
- Bob Rock, "Flavor of the Weak" by American Hi-Fi and "Make It Right" by Econoline Crush

=== Best Recording Engineer ===
Winner: Randy Staub, "How You Remind Me" and "Too Bad" by Nickelback

Other Nominees:

- Richard Chycki, "Jaded" by Aerosmith and "When You Know" by Shawn Colvin
- Pierre Marchand, "Evil Angel" and "Greek Song" by Rufus Wainwright
- Jeff Martin and Nick Blagona, "Angels" and "Lullaby" by The Tea Party
- Brad Nelson, "Followed Her Around" and "You and Me" by Jimmy Rankin

=== Canadian Music Hall of Fame ===
Winner: Daniel Lanois

=== Walt Grealis Special Achievement Award ===
Winner: Michael Cohl

== Nominated and winning albums ==
=== Best Album ===
Winner: The Look of Love, Diana Krall

Other Nominees:

- All Killer No Filler, Sum 41
- Silver Side Up, Nickelback
- Spiritual Machines, Our Lady Peace
- Whoa, Nelly!, Nelly Furtado

=== Best Blues Album ===
Winner: Big Mouth, Colin Linden

Other Nominees:

- Breakfast at Midnight, Rita Chiarelli
- Drive On, Michael Jerome Browne
- Double Shot!, Mel Brown and Snooky Pryor
- Rattlebag, Paul Reddick and The Sidemen

=== Best Children's Album ===
Winner: A Classical Kids Christmas, Susan Hammond

Other Nominees:

- Call of the Wild, Aaron Burnett
- Chase a Rainbow, The Just Kidding Band
- Red's in the Hood, Judy & David
- Songs from the Boom Box, Judy & David

=== Best Classical Album (Solo or Chamber Ensemble) ===
Winner: Bach Arrangements, Angela Hewitt

Other Nominees:

- Beethoven: Sonatas for Piano & Violin, Jane Coop (piano), Andrew Dawes (violin)
- Schumann: Fantasy in C Major, Marc-Andre Hamelin
- Somers String Quartets, Accordes String Quartet
- Transcendental Liszt, Janina Fialkowska

=== Best Classical Album (Large Ensemble or Soloist(s) with Large Ensemble Accompaniment) ===
Winner: Max Bruch, Concertos 1 & 3, James Ehnes (violin), Montreal Symphony Orchestra

Other Nominees:

- Concert Francais, James Ehnes (violin), Orchestre Symphonique de Québec
- English Piano Concerti: Britten, Rawsthorne, Ireland, Finzi, Jane Coop (piano), CBC Radio Orchestra
- J.S. Bach: Art of the Fugue, Les Violons du Roy
- Myaskovsky - Schinittke - Denisov, Stepan Arman (violin), I Musici de Montreal

=== Best Classical Album (Vocal or Choral Performance) ===
Winner: Airs Francais, Ben Heppner

Other Nominees:

- Exsultate, Jubilate, Karina Gauvin (soprano), CBC Radio Orchestra
- Forgotten Songs, Forgotten Loves, Wendy Nielsen
- Handel: Sacred Arias, Daniel Taylor
- Singing Somers Theatre, Monica Whicher (soprano), Robert Cram (flute), various soloists

=== Best Album Design ===
Winner: Sebastien Toupin, Benoit St-Jean, Michel Valois, Martin Tremblay, Disparu by La Chicane

Other Nominees:

- Garnet Armstrong, Lionel Drew, The Audio of Being by Matthew Good Band
- Carylann Loeppky, Poem by Delerium
- Our Lady Peace, Catherine McRae, Oli Goldsmith, Spiritual Machines by Our Lady Peace
- John Rummen, Sam Findlay, H-Wing by Kevin Hearn and Thin Buckle

=== Best Gospel Album ===
Winner: Downhere, Downhere

Other Nominees:

- Imagerical, Matt Brouwer
- Love Letters, Londa Larmond
- Travelers, Carolyn Arends
- Waiting for Aidan, Steve Bell

=== Best Instrumental Album ===
Winner: Armando's Fire, Oscar Lopez

Other Nominees:

- Angel's Embrace, Dan Gibson, David Bradstreet
- Fiesta Del Sol, Kenny Vehkavaara
- Inspiration Classique, Richard Abel
- The English Country Garden, Dan Gibson, John Herberman

=== Best Selling Album (Foreign or Domestic) ===
Winner: Hot Shot, Shaggy

Other Nominees:

- All That You Can't Leave Behind, U2
- Black & Blue, Backstreet Boys
- Chocolate Starfish and the Hot Dog Flavored Water, Limp Bizkit
- Survivor, Destiny's Child

=== Best Traditional Jazz Album - Instrumental ===
Winner: Live at the Senator, Mike Murley, Ed Bickert and Steve Wallace

Other Nominees:

- And It Really Was..., The Brigham Phillips Big Band
- Forgotten Memories, Don Thompson
- Spectacular, Campbell Ryga
- Street Culture, Paul Tobey

=== Best Contemporary Jazz Album - Instrumental ===
Winner: Live, François Bourassa Trio and Andre LeRoux

Other Nominees:

- Nuage, Jeff Johnston
- Of Battles Unknown Mysteries, Chris Tarry
- Sigame, D.D. Jackson
- The Recline, Metalwood

=== Best Vocal Jazz Album ===
Winner: The Look of Love, Diana Krall

Other Nominees:

- Image in the Mirror the Triptych, Jeri Brown
- I Saw the Sky, Melissa Walker
- It's Wonderful, Susie Arioli Swing Band
- Tribute, Emilie-Claire Barlow

=== Best Roots or Traditional Album - Group ===
Winner: Cordial, La Bottine Souriante

Other Nominees:

- Petit fou, Matapat
- Post Atomic Hillbilly, Undertakin' Daddies
- Sin & Other Salvations, The Wyrd Sisters
- Songs of Work & Freedom, The Brothers Cosmoline

=== Best Roots or Traditional Album - Solo ===
Winner: Far End of Summer, David Francey

Other Nominees:

- Beyond the Storm, Eileen McGann
- For a Song, Maria Dunn
- Gather Honey, Penny Lang
- Verchuosity, April Verch

=== Best Alternative Album ===
Winner: Poses, Rufus Wainwright

Other Nominees:

- Constantines, The Constantines
- Down at the Khyber, The Joel Plaskett Emergency
- (Last Night We Were) The Delicious Wolves, Hawksley Workman
- Night of the Shooting Stars, Rheostatics

=== Best Selling Francophone Album ===
Winner: Les vents ont changé, Kevin Parent

Other Nominees:

- Cordial, La Bottine Souriante
- Disparu, La Chicane
- Du coq à l'âme, Lynda Lemay
- Etc..., Gabrielle Destroismaisons

=== Best Pop Album ===
Winner: Morning Orbit, David Usher

Other Nominees:

- Girl Versions, Emm Gryner
- Open, Cowboy Junkies
- Saturday People, Prozzäk
- Ten New Songs, Leonard Cohen

=== Best Rock Album ===
Winner: Silver Side Up, Nickelback

Other Nominees:

- All Killer No Filler, Sum 41
- Brothers and Sisters, Are You Ready?, Big Sugar
- Pretty Together, Sloan
- Purge, Bif Naked

== Nominated and winning releases ==
=== Best Single ===
Winner: "How You Remind Me", Nickelback

Other Nominees:

- "California", Wave
- "Everybody's Got A Story", Amanda Marshall
- "If It Feels Good Do It", Sloan
- "Life", Our Lady Peace

=== Best Music of Aboriginal Canada Recording ===
Winner: On and On, Eagle & Hawk

Other Nominees:

- Crazy Maker, Marcel Gagnon
- Dark Realm, Nakoda Lodge
- My Ojibway Experience, Strength & Hope, Billy Joe Green
- Riel's Road, Sandy Scofield

=== Best Classical Composition ===
Winner: "Par-ci, par-la", Chan Ka Nin, Nouveaux Territoires by Ensemble Contemporain de Montréal

Other Nominees:

- "Concerto for Viola and Orchestra", Peter Paul Koprowski, Redemption: Peter Paul Koprowski Concerti
- "Love Songs", Owen Underhill, Celestial Machine
- "Serinette", Harry Somers, Serinette
- "Suite for Klezmer Band and Orchestra", Sid Robinovitch, Klezmer Suite: Music of Sid Robinovitch

=== Best Dance Recording ===
Winner: "Spaced Invader", Hatiras

Other Nominees:

- "Absolutely Not", Deborah Cox
- "Innocente", Delerium
- "It Doesn't Matter", The Underdog Project
- "The Light", Elissa

=== Best Rap Recording ===
Winner: Bad Dreams, Swollen Members

Other Nominees:

- "Easy to Slip", Solitair
- Quest for Fire: Firestarter, Vol. 1, Kardinal Offishall
- Jelleestone Thirteen, Jelleestone
- "Still Too Much", Ghetto Concept with Snow, Kardinal Offishall, Maestro, Red-One, and Ironside

=== Best R&B/Soul Recording ===
Winner: "Don't You Forget It", Glenn Lewis

Other Nominees:

- "Day Dreaming", Chin Injeti
- "Never Leave Hurt Alone", Sugar Jones
- "The Day Before", Baby Blue Soundcrew featuring Jully Black, Baby Cham
- "Unforgettable", Jamie Sparks

=== Best Reggae Recording ===
Winner: "Love (African Woman)", Blessed

Other Nominees:

- "A Friend for Life", Iley Dread
- "Breathe", Sonia Collymore
- "Never Let Jah Go", Chester Miller
- "They Called Me Madness", Peculiar I

=== Best Global Album ===
Winner: The Journey, Alpha Yaya Diallo

Other Nominees:

- Alma De Santiago, Jane Bunnett
- Distant Wind, Mei Han, Randy Raine-Reusch
- Havana Remembered, Hilario Durán
- Kashish Attraction, Kiran Ahluwalia

=== Best Video ===
Winner: Sean Michael Turrell, "Jealous of Your Cigarette" by Hawksley Workman

Other Nominees:

- Oli Goldsmith, "In Repair" by Our Lady Peace
- Josh Levy, "I Hear You Calling" by Gob
- Stephen Scott, "Plumb Song" by Snow
- Floria Sigismondi, "In My Secret Life" by Leonard Cohen
