= Popstars Live =

Popstars Live is an Australian music talent show television program similar to Australian Idol that aired on the Seven Network in early 2004. It was an evolution of the original Popstars TV show which aired between 2000 and 2002 on Seven. The show spawned a single and album that made the ARIA charts in April that year.

Popstars Live premiered on the Seven Network in February 2004. It was scheduled to run for sixteen weeks and was originally slated to air on Sunday and Wednesday nights. During its short run Popstars Live had a troubled history, with two key personnel, Christine Anu and John Paul Young, leaving the program in April 2004 while others have publicly expressed their own concerns about the show. The show was also a ratings failure.

== Origins ==
Popstars Live was based on the original Popstars, a reality television program that was broadcast on the Seven Network between 2000 and 2002. The aim of that program was to select members for a group or a solo singer and follow the process of recording a single and/or album and the subsequent promotion of the record made by the artists.

The Australian TV show saw the creation of three acts which enjoyed initial success:

- Bardot (2000) a girl group number one single and album;
- Scandal'us (2001) a mixed pop group, number one single, number two album;
- Scott Cain (2002) a male singer, number one single.

While the first season of Popstars was one of the most popular programs on Australian television in 2000, its popularity steadily declined in later seasons. In 2003, the Seven Network rested the concept. However, the success of Australian Idol, a show that became the most popular program on Australian television that year, soon led to the Seven Network revisiting the Popstars format.

Record sales for Idol contestants also played a role in the resurrection of Popstars with Australian Idol winner Guy Sebastian releasing an album Just as I Am that went six times platinum in Australia and runner up Shannon Noll's That's What I'm Talking About striking up sales of five times platinum. Hoping to emulate the success of BMG Records, which had signed on Sebastian and Noll, Universal Music quickly signed up for the new series.

== Format ==
The first five episodes featured the selection of the finalists by the judges. The finalists would then sing live in front of an audience with one finalist being eliminated each week until the final winner is selected. The program aimed to attract a large proportion of voters under 25, a similar as Australian Idol.

== Cast ==
The Popstars Team consisted of:

- Luke Jacobz host;
- Ian "Molly" Meldrum judge;
- Christine Anu judge;
- Shauna Jensen judge;
- Tania Doko artist mentor;
- John Paul Young artist mentor;

The judges initially said that they would offer constructive criticism to the contestants unlike the strong and sometimes personal criticism offered by Mark Holden and Ian "Dicko" Dickson of rival series Australian Idol.

== Finalists ==
The finalists were (in order of elimination):

- Tarryn Wall
- Renee Simone
- Kiki Courtidis
- Don Pancho
- Daniel Hamill
- Arrnott Olssen
- Eleven (Luke and Nick)
- Sarah Gardner - who made it into the top 63 in Australian Idol 2007 - see image 10 of the top 63 at http://www.australianidol.com.au/photos.html?xmlFile=830.xml
- Miranda Murphy, from Perth, Western Australia. On 12 July 2004, her debut single, "That Girl" debuted at number 19 on the Australian singles charts on 22 July 2004. After an unusually lengthy hiatus from the music scene, and a general lack of activity, it is widely suspected she has been dropped by her record company, due to poor single sales, and a national declining interest in 'bubblegum pop' products of talent quest programs. She now works at "Jaanz school of singing".
- Kayne Taylor, from Melbourne, Victoria who won the 2004 Australian season.

Contestants Bunny and Xy were axed from the program in controversial circumstances. Kayne Taylor ended up winning altogether, defeating Miranda Murphy in the final.

== Reception and controversies ==
The first live performance attracted disappointing ratings when broadcast, attracting only 850,000 in Australian mainland capitals, finishing behind American Idol on Network Ten and shows on the Nine Network. David Leckie, the managing director of the Seven Network, blamed the disappointing ratings on what he considered to be the bland comments of the judges and pressured the producers to ensure that the judges made stronger comments.

Christine Anu refused to offer harsh criticism of the contestants resigning in April 2004. In a statement issued on her departure, she said: "I chose to play a positive role model and wanted to encourage these young people in their endeavours, rather than criticise them. Although leaving Popstars Live was a difficult decision for me to make, I do feel somewhat relieved that I can now focus on my music." John Paul Young was sacked although the producers claimed that his contract had finished.

Ian "Molly" Meldrum and Tania Doko were also criticising elements of the program in the media in early April. Trevor Steel, a UK record producer and the former lead singer of eighties pop group The Escape Club, was brought in by Universal Music as a replacement judge to offer stronger criticism of contestants.

Ratings for Popstars Live continued to decline for the next episode. With 2003 Australian ratings blockbuster The Block due to commence its 2004 season on the Nine Network and American Idol performing well on Network Ten, the Seven Network executives shifted the program from Sunday night to Saturday night and scheduled wildlife documentaries to fill the slot. As Saturday night is the night of the week when the fewest people watch television in Australia and when members of the target audience for Popstars Live are most likely to go out, this shift was widely perceived as an admission of defeat by network executives. The Saturday night program was dropped altogether a few episodes later, leaving only the Wednesday program.

== Album ==
Universal Music released an album Popstars Live: The Finalists featuring the finalists singing versions of well-known songs. The first single "Stand Up Next to Me" features the finalists singing on the track.

=== Sales Performance ===
In their first week of sales from 5 April 2004, the single barely made the Australian Top 50 and the album could only debut at number 61. Although Universal Music shipped enough copies of both the single and the album to stores to achieve gold status in Australia (35,000 copies), the single and the album only sold one thousand copies. The single eventually reached #29 on the charts and the album reached the ARIA Top 50. Kayne Taylor's debut single Heartbreaker debuted in the top 10 of the Australian charts at the end of June 2004. Runner-up Miranda Murphy also had a debut single That Girl released, and it debuted in the top 20 a few weeks after. However, this didn't seem to boost the success of Popstars Live nor its contestants, with no others releasing singles, nor have Kayne or Miranda released a second single as of November 2004.

This contrasts with the sales success of artists appearing on Australian Idol and to a lesser extent the original Popstars. With the television program being moved to a different timeslot less likely to catch the eyes of potential record buyers and the single failing to attract support of radio, it seems as though the album will disappoint the hopes of Universal Music who would have been hoping to match the success of BMG Records from Australian Idol contestants.

=== Track listing ===
The track listing for the album is:

1. "Stand Up Next To Me" (all finalists)
2. "Don't Dream It's Over" - Kiki (hit for Crowded House)
3. "Jealous Guy" - Kayne Taylor (hit for John Lennon and later Roxy Music)
4. "Killing Me Softly with His Song" - Miranda Murphy (hit for Roberta Flack and later the Fugees)
5. "Tainted Love" - Don Pancho (hit for Gloria Jones and later Soft Cell)
6. "Truly Madly Deeply" - Tarryn (originally a hit for Savage Garden)
7. "Beautiful" - Arrnott Olssen (hit for Christina Aguilera)
8. "Nothing Compares 2 U" - Renee Simone (originally by Prince, hit for Sinéad O'Connor)
9. "The Air That I Breathe" - Daniel Hamill (originally a hit for The Hollies)
10. "Everybody Wants to Rule the World" - Luke Parry and Nick de Silwa (originally a hit for Tears for Fears)
11. "Everlasting Love" - Sarah Gardner (originally a hit for a variety of artists including U2 and Gloria Estefan)
12. "You Will Always Shine" - Bunny and Xy written by Willie Allen

== See also ==
- List of Australian music television shows
