= Down Down Down (Lollipop song) =

2001 song by Lollipop

Single by Lollipop

from the album Popstars
- Released: 30 March 2001
- Recorded: 2001
- Genre: Teen pop
- Length: 3:10
- Label: Warner Music Italy
- Composer: Sabrina Pistone
- Lyricist: Sabrina Pistone
- Producers: Roberto Nardiello; Sabrina Pistone

Lollipop singles chronology
| "Down Down Down" (2001) | "Don't Leave Me Now" (2001) |

Music video
- "Down Down Down" on YouTube

"Down Down Down" is a song by Lollipop, a girl group formed during the first series of Italian talent-show Popstars. The song, written in English by Sabrina Pistone, was arranged and produced by the latter with Roberto Nardiello.

The single debuted in stores on March 30, 2001, and in the aftermath of the end of Popstars broadcast entered the top-selling singles chart in Italy directly at No. 1. "Down Down Down" remained at the top spot for three weeks, only to be undermined by Depeche Mode's "Dream On" on April 20, 2001, and then returned to the top for another week on April 27. The single sold over 150 000 copies, becoming their biggest hit.

Lollipops promoted the single with numerous performances on television programs. Among the tracks on the CD single, in addition to two remixes, there was also "Everybody Come On (Wanna Be a Popstar)", the theme song of the TV show Popstars reinterpreted by the girl group.

== Music video ==
The music video for "Down Down Down", directed by Luca Merli, was recorded on March 30, 2001 (Lollipop's formation day) in Milan's Alcatraz nightclub. Popstars host Daniele Bossari appears in a cameo.

== Track listing ==
Digital download
| No. | Title | Producer(s) | Length |
|---|---|---|---|
| 1. | "Down Down Down" | Roberto Nardiello, Sabrina Pistone | 3:10 |

== Charts ==
| Chart (2001) | Peak position |
|---|---|
| Italy (FIMI) | 1 |
| Switzerland (Schweizer Hitparade) | 91 |

== Certifications ==
| Region | Certification | Certified units/sales |
|---|---|---|
| Italy (FIMI) | Multi-platinum | 150,000* |
‡ Sales+streaming figures based on certification alone.
