= Hilary Duff (disambiguation) =

Hilary Duff (born 1987) is an American actress, singer-songwriter, entrepreneur, and author.

Hilary Duff may also refer to:

- Hilary Duff (album), the eponymous third studio album by American recording artist Hilary Duff
- Hilary Duff (song), a song by Scott Cain
