= Emanuel Ntaka =

Argentine musician and activist

- Born: 12 December 1977 (age 47); Buenos Aires, Argentina
- Genres: Pop
- Occupations: Singer; songwriter; activist
- Years active: 2002–present
- Labels: BMG; NTK

Emanuel Ntaka (born 12 December 1977) is an Argentine singer, songwriter and activist. He was a member of the pop boyband Mambrú, formed in 2002 in the second series of the Argentine reality TV competition Popstars.

== Early life ==
Ntaka was born on 12 December 1977 in Buenos Aires, Argentina. His father was Blues Ntaka (1935–2001), a South African anti-apartheid activist and musician. His mother was Antonia Scarpati, an Argentine from Santiago del Estero. The two met while Ntaka was touring, while in exile, in Italy. Emanuel has two older siblings, both of whom were born in Italy.

He followed his father's footsteps in pursuing a musical career, enrolling at the Escuela Nacional de Música Juan Pedro Esnaola, later following up his professional studies at the Conservatorio Superior de Música Manuel de Falla. Before reaching success, Ntaka worked as a barman at a salsa bar in Buenos Aires.

== Musical career ==
Before 2002, Ntaka formed part of a band by the name of Living Covers. In 2002, he participated in the second series of the Argentine reality TV competition Popstars. The first series, released the year prior, had already resulted in the formation of the successful girl group Bandana; the second series set out to form an all-male pop group to match Bandana's success. As part of the programme's selection process, Ntaka underwent training in choreography, professional recording and fitness coaching.

Ntaka was one of the five (and the eldest) selected members of what would become Mambrú. The group's debut album, released in October 2002, had become a triple platinum record by 2003. During the following years, Mambrú became one of the most successful pop acts in Argentina, embarking on a Latin American tour and releasing two more albums: Creciendo (2003) and Mambrú 3 (2005). The group received a number of accolades, including three Gardel Awards and a Martín Fierro Award. They played in every single Argentine province, in a tour that spanned 2004–2005. Their aim was to 'sing to the entire country', and local bands were recruited to work as supporting artists in their various hometowns.

Despite their success, Mambrú separated as a group in August 2005. Milton Amadeo had already split from the group, pursuing a solo career, in 2003.

Following his departure from Mambrú, Ntaka launched his solo career, releasing an album in 2009 by the name of No pares, shifting his influences from pop rock to a more traditional sound informed by African influences. He would go on to launch his own record label, NTK Records. In 2014, he produced the album Sonidos negros en Argentina, released under NTK.

== Activism ==
Since the beginning of his solo career, Ntaka has sought to raise awareness of Afro-Argentine music and culture. In 2016, he was appointed as coordinator of the Afro Culture Programme, part of the Directorate of Socio-cultural Programmes at the Argentine ministry of culture. The programme grants financial support and promotes cultural projects developed by Afro-Argentines.
