= Together (Lollipop album) =

Studio album by Lollipop
- Released: January 23, 2004
- Recorded: 2003
- Genre: Pop; Teen pop
- Length: 34:36
- Label: WEA Records / Warner Music Italy

Lollipop chronology
Popstars (2001)	Together (2004)

Together is the second studio album by Italian girl group Lollipop, released on January 23, 2004, via WEA Records / Warner Music Italy. The album was more mature than the previous Popstars but it was released by WEA without any promotion on radio or television and, as a result of this decision, it didn't even peak at #75 in the Italian album chart. It spawned two singles: "Dreaming Of Love" (#50) and "You" (digital release only).

Each member sings a solo song on this album and Dominique Fidanza and Roberta Ruiu wrote their own songs.

After the flop of this album the record label decided to drop them and the group eventually disbanded.

== Track listing ==
#	Title	Length
1.	"Dreaming Of Love"	3:55
2.	"You"	3:08
3.	"Always Got Your Back" (Marcella's song)	3:30
4.	"Stop"	3:17
5.	"Baby" (Veronica's song)	3:35
6.	"Love 4 Free" (Dominique's song)	3:15
7.	"Sunshine" (Marta's song)	3:05
8.	"& Me You"	3:44
9.	"Love Is Gonna Change"	3:30
10.	"Non È Solo Un'Emozione" (Roberta's song)	3:33

== Charts ==
Album

Year	Chart	Position
2004	Italian album chart	80

Singles

Information
Dreaming Of Love
- Released: January 2004
- Writers: F.Lamoy, A.Weeden, J.Cuneta
- Chart positions: #50 (ITA)
You digital release only
- Writers: G.Giorgilli, L.Rana, N.Peloso
- Released: January 2003
