= Kotschy =

Kotschy is a surname. Notable people with the surname include:

- Carl Friedrich Kotschy (1789–1856), Austrian theologian and botanist
- Theodor Kotschy (1813–1866), Austrian botanist and explorer, son of Carl
- Johannes Kotschy (born 1979), Swedish singer and songwriter
