= Roller Coaster (Scott Cain album) =

Studio album by Scott Cain
- Released: 11 October 2004
- Recorded: Unknown
- Genre: Pop, children's
- Length: 48:18
- Label: ABC Kids
- Producer: Nick Howard

Scott Cain chronology
Controlled Folly (2002)	Roller Coaster (2004)	Spero (2009)

Roller Coaster is the second album, released in 2004, by Scott Cain, singer-songwriter and winner of Australian Popstars 2002. It was released on the ABC Kids label and is targeted at children, but is lyrically relatively adult and not dissimilar to his debut album, Controlled Folly. However Cain co-wrote every song on Roller Coaster compared to only two on his debut.

The album's themes, according to the press release, are "songs that most kids can relate to; from having your first celebrity crush, hanging out, and generally enjoying life". Many of the tracks on Roller Coaster relate somehow to skateboarding. The track "Hilary Duff" (about Hilary Duff, sometimes called "I've Got a Crush on Hilary Duff") was released for airplay as a promotional single, and a music video was shot, but the track never quite saw release as a proper commercial single. The track "Perfect Day" here made its second appearance, having also been included on Controlled Folly in 2002, and "Step Into My World" was originally released on a Roadshow compilation in 2003.

Despite massive commercial failure, this album sparked a minor career revival for Cain, who received limited airplay with "Hilary Duff" and soon after the album's release opened for Hilary Duff on her tour of Australia. The track "Don't Stop Rollin'" also became well known for coining the popular expression "Chafeboard! Watch out!". However, Roller Coaster is now out of print and was entirely removed from the ABC website less than a year after release.

In 2005, Roller Coaster was picked up by an independent distributor in Japan, where it became surprisingly popular on the children's market. The Japanese release added five bonus tracks, including rarities and previously unreleased material.

== Track listing ==
1. "Hilary Duff" – 3:58
2. "Roller Coaster" – 3:07
3. "Perfect Day" – 4:28
4. "Surfer Girl" – 3:04
5. "Crazy" – 2:59
6. "Made to Dance" – 3:37
7. "Don't Stop Rollin'" – 3:45
8. "Poppa to the Pop" – 4:41
9. "Wonderful Life" – 3:10
10. "Shake It" – 3:51
11. "Popcorn People" – 3:53
12. "Step Into My World" – 4:22
13. "Zoe's Song" – 3:23
  Japanese bonus tracks:
14. "Don't Stop Rollin'" [Roll to Infinity Dub] – 5:23
15. "Made to Dance" [Club Mix Edit] – 4:35
16. "Step Into My World" [12" Extended Version] – 5:54
17. "I'm Moving On" [Live] – 3:26
18. "Zoe's Song" [Acoustic] – 2:32
