= Jamie Sparks (singer) =

Canadian singer, songwriter, record producer, musician

Jamie Sparks (born in Cherry Brook, Nova Scotia) is a Canadian R&B and soul singer, songwriter, record producer and musician playing bass and keyboards. In 2002, he was nominated for a Juno Award for Best R&B/Soul Recording at the Juno Awards of 2002. In 2010, he won the "R&B Artist of the Year" at the Independent Music Awards in Canada and the "Single Track Recording of the Year" at the 2010 East Coast Music Awards (ECMA). Montreal Jazz Festival gave him the "Award of Excellence - the Professional Publishers and Songwriter Award." He has also won eight East Coast Music Awards in Canada and two African Nova Scotian Music Awards. He is best known for his singles Tender Love and Unforgettable.

Since 2006, he has released a number of albums including It's the Music (2007 and 2008), G1RLS (2011), We're Gonna Make It (2012), Rhythm & Soul and Reggae Vibes (2013), Back to the Funk (2015) and Wake Up Call (2017). Sparks has also written music for the soundtrack of the Spike Lee movie You're Nobody 'til Somebody Kills You and for the 2018 TV series 5th Ward.

From a young age, Sparks became a bass player and toured with various rock, African, calypso, R&B and jazz bands. In 2006, he released a seven-track EP titled Jamie Sparks: Git Wit U and appeared on Beat Factory Groove Essentials compilation on EMI and released Jamie Sparks: The Time in 1998. The single Unforgettable in 2000 was re-released with remixes under the title Fun Tonight in 2004 with P.Diddy's Daddy's House Recording Studios, a division of Bad Boy Entertainment. Starting mid-2000s, he became head of operations for Kicksta Music Group/Kicksta Muzik Publishing, with a roster of talented artists, songwriters and producers contributing to their releases and remixes and music to film/TV productions and record labels, operating in Canada and the U.S.

== Personal life ==
Sparks' father was a deacon at the Cherry Brook United Baptist Church. His brothers were also musicians and his mother, Evelyn Sparks, had been deeply involved in music, forming a family choir in which Jamie and his siblings sang and played instruments.

His song Wake Up Call was written about his son Josiah Sparks, who died on September 14, 2017, at the age of 22. Josiah's murder remains unsolved even three years after the incident.

== Discography ==
=== Albums ===
- Jamie Sparks: The Time (1998)
- Unforgettable (2000)
- Fun Tonight (remix) (2004)
- Scotia Mix, Vol. 1 (2006)
- It's the Music (2007)
- It's the Music - Reloaded (2008)
- G1RLS (2011)
- We're Gonna Make It (2012)
- Rhythm & Soul (2013)
- Reggae Vibes (EP) (2013)
- Back to the Funk (2015)
- Wake Up Call (2017)

=== Singles ===
- "Unforgettable" (2000)
- "Gonna Get Down" (2005)
- "Tender Love" (2009)
- "All I Need" (remix) (2009)
- "Wake Up Call" (2017)
- "Brighter Day" (2018)

Featured in

- September (remixes) (2009) (DJ Favorite feat. Jamie Sparks)
