= Gerónimo Rauch =

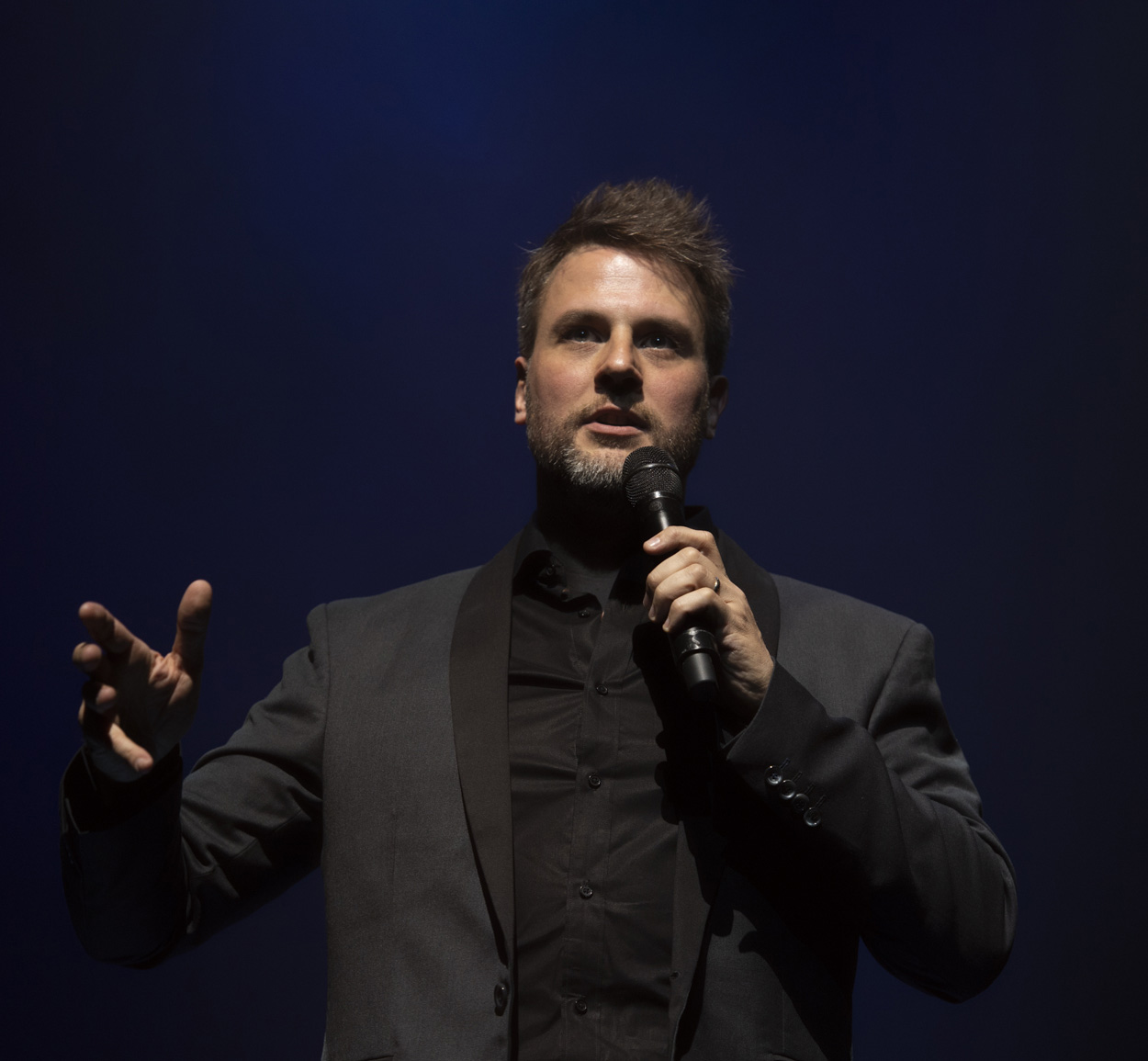
- Rauch in 2018

Background information
- Origin: Buenos Aires, Argentina
- Genres: Musical theatre; Pop
- Occupations: Actor; Singer
- Years active: 2000–present

Gerónimo Rauch (born February 11, 1978) is an Argentine actor and singer known for his work in musical theatre in Latin America, Europe, and Asia. He is recognized for being one of the few Hispanic artists to perform the leading role of Jean Valjean in Les Misérables both in London's West End and on a world tour. He has also starred as the titular character in the West End production of The Phantom of the Opera.

== Biography ==
=== Early life and career in Argentina (1978–2006) ===
Rauch was born in Buenos Aires, Argentina. He is the brother of actress Victoria Rauch and musical theatre actor Marcos Rauch. He began his theatrical career in 2000 performing in the Argentine production of Les Misérables at the Teatro Ópera in Buenos Aires, where he played Feuilly and served as an understudy for Marius and Enjolras. In 2001, he played Doody in the musical Grease at the Teatro Astral. During this period, he also performed a cappella music with the sextet Voxpop, covering songs by the band Queen.

In 2002, Rauch participated in the Argentine reality television show Popstars. He emerged as one of the five winners, alongside Emanuel Ntaka, Milton Amadeo, Germán Tripel, and Pablo Silberberg, forming the vocal group Mambrú. The band's debut album achieved triple-platinum certification in sales. Following the dissolution of Mambrú in mid-2005, Rauch initiated his solo career, recording the song "Dale Argentina" for the 2006 FIFA World Cup broadcast on Telefe and appearing on the musical television program Música para soñar.

=== Stage career in Spain and the West End (2007–2023) ===
Rauch returned to musical theatre in 2007, portraying Jesus in a production of Jesus Christ Superstar at the Teatro Bristol in Argentina. After a video of his performance was reviewed online, Spanish production company Stage Entertainment cast him to take over the same titular role in the production running at the Teatro Lope de Vega in Madrid. He later led the Spanish touring production of the show, earning a nomination for Best Actor at the Premios del Teatro Musical. At the end of 2009, he played Mary Sunshine in the musical Chicago at the Teatro Coliseum in Madrid, receiving a second nomination at the Premios del Teatro Musical for Best Supporting Actor.

In November 2010, Rauch starred as Jean Valjean in a new Spanish adaptation of Les Misérables at the Teatro Lope de Vega in Madrid. He participated in the 25th anniversary concert of Les Misérables held at The O2 Arena in London in October 2010. From April to July 2011, he produced and performed in the concert show Póker de Voces alongside David Ordinas, Daniel Diges, Ignasi Vidal, and Zenón Recalde. He later reprised his role as Jean Valjean when the Spanish production of Les Misérables transferred to the Gran Teatre del Liceu in Barcelona, where it ran until March 2012. On December 29, 2011, he made his classical music debut at the Auditorio Nacional de Música in Madrid, accompanied by the Orquesta Sinfónica de Chamartín.

In June 2012, Rauch made his London West End debut as Jean Valjean in Les Misérables at the Queen's Theatre. Between 2012 and 2015, he performed as a West End leading actor, subsequently taking on the role of The Phantom in The Phantom of the Opera at Her Majesty's Theatre.

Rauch returned to Spain in late 2017 to star as Joe Gillis in the first Spanish-language version of Sunset Boulevard alongside Paloma San Basilio at the Auditorio de Tenerife. In 2019, he won the 1960s-themed episode of the RTVE musical contest show La mejor canción jamás cantada with a performance of "Yo soy aquél". That same year, he joined the cast of El médico, el musical at the Teatro Nuevo Apolo in Madrid to play the protagonist Rob J. Cole. In 2020, he appeared in La Llamada, el musical in the role of God. In late 2023, he reprised the role of The Phantom in a new production of The Phantom of the Opera at the Teatro Albéniz in Madrid following a run at the Teatro Arriaga in Bilbao.

=== Solo music projects and international arena tour (2016–present) ===
In 2016, Rauch signed with Sony Music and released his first solo album, Here, There and Everywhere, a tribute to The Beatles. He presented the album live at the Teatro Maipo in Buenos Aires and the Teatro de la Zarzuela in Madrid. In 2017, he performed his solo concert show Songbook at the Teatro Colón and the Luna Park stadium in Buenos Aires. His second solo album, Porque yo te amo, was produced by Humberto Gatica and released through Sony Music in 2018.

In July 2023, Rauch celebrated his 23-year career with the intimate show This is Me at the Teatro Avenida in Buenos Aires. In 2024, he released the solo album Chapter One under the Rose Records label, featuring tracks composed by Frank Wildhorn, recorded in both English and Spanish.

In 2025, Rauch co-produced and starred in Cinema All-In, a hybrid theatrical and cinematic concert format created alongside his brother Marcos Rauch in Buenos Aires. In 2026, marking 26 years of professional activity, he embarked on a commemorative concert tour titled "26 Años en Escena" with performances scheduled across Madrid, Buenos Aires, Barcelona, and London. Following these concerts, Rauch was confirmed to rejoin the global tour of Les Misérables: The Arena Spectacular World Tour for its 40th anniversary celebrations, portraying Jean Valjean at venues including the Royal Albert Hall in London, the Radio City Music Hall in New York, the 3Arena in Dublin, the Utilita Arena in Birmingham, and arena venues across Tokyo and Asia.

== Vocal and Stage Training ==
Rauch received vocal training under instructors Edelmiro Arnaltes, Suso Mariategui, Martín Durañona, Rodolfo Valss, and Cristian Bruno. His training in the dramatic arts was completed under Joy Morris, Adriana Perewozki, the Escuela de Luis Romero, and Cinema Room.

== Selected Theatre Credits ==
Year	Title	Role	Production / Theatre	Ref.
2000	Les Misérables	Feuilly	Teatro Ópera (Buenos Aires)	
2001	Grease	Doody	Teatro Astral (Buenos Aires)	
2007	Jesus Christ Superstar	Jesus	Teatro Bristol (Argentina) / Teatro Lope de Vega (Madrid)	
2009	Chicago	Mary Sunshine	Teatro Coliseum (Madrid)	
2010–2011	Les Misérables	Jean Valjean	Teatro Lope de Vega (Madrid) / Gran Teatre del Liceu (Barcelona)	
2012	Les Misérables	Jean Valjean	West End, Queen's Theatre	
2013–2015	The Phantom of the Opera	The Phantom	West End, Her Majesty's Theatre	
2017	Sunset Boulevard	Joe Gillis	Auditorio de Tenerife	
2018–2019	El médico, el musical	Rob J. Cole	Teatro Nuevo Apolo (Madrid)	
2020	La Llamada, el musical	God	Spanish Production	
2023	The Phantom of the Opera	The Phantom	Teatro Arriaga (Bilbao) / Teatro Albéniz (Madrid)	
2026	Les Misérables: The Arena Spectacular	Jean Valjean	World Tour	

== Discography ==
=== Solo Albums ===
- Here, There and Everywhere (Sony Music, 2016)
- Porque yo te amo (Sony Music, 2018)
- Chapter One (Rose Records, 2024)

=== with Mambrú ===
- Mambrú (RGB / Sony & BMG, 2002)
- Creciendo (RGB / Sony & BMG, 2003)
- Tres (RGB / Sony & BMG, 2004)
