= Crazy People Rock =

Single by Scott Cain

from the album Controlled Folly
- Released: 19 August 2002
- Recorded: Studio M & Tiger Studio, Sydney
- Genre: Pop
- Length: 3:23
- Label: Warner Music
- Songwriters: Gregg Alexander, Rick Nowels.
- Producer: Michael Szumowski

Scott Cain singles chronology
"I'm Moving On" (2002)	"Crazy People Rock" (2002)	"Oceans in Between" (2002)

"Crazy People Rock" is a song by Australian singer Scott Cain. It was released as the follow-up to his #1 hit "I'm Moving On" in August 2002 as the second single from this debut studio album, Controlled Folly. "Crazy People Rock" peaked at number 39. The song was written by Gregg Alexander of the New Radicals and frequent collaborator Rick Nowels. The B-sides were the new track "On the Dance Floor" and remixes of the lead song.

== Track listing ==
1. "Crazy People Rock" (Album Version) 3:34
2. "Crazy People Rock" (Radio Remix) 3:17
3. "On the Dance Floor" 3:45
4. "Crazy People Rock" (Wok Institute Remix) 8:05
5. "Crazy People Rock" (Supafly Remix) 6:23

== Charts ==
Chart (2002)	Peak position
Australia (ARIA)	39
