= J. R. Vautour =

- Born: Toronto, Ontario, Canada
- Genres: Country
- Occupation: Singer-songwriter
- Years active: 2000–present
- Label: Busy Music
- Website: www.jrvautour.com

J. R. Vautour is a Canadian country music artist from Toronto, Ontario. In his career, he has recorded three studio albums and released more than fifteen singles. He was also nominated for a Juno Awards 2002, a Canadian Country Music award, and an East Coast Music Award.

== Biography ==
J. R. Vautour was born in Toronto, Ontario and raised in Minto, New Brunswick. He began performing at a young age, finishing second to Beverley Mahood in the 12-and-under category of a Brantford, Ontario singing contest. When he turned 18, Vautour's parents took him to Nashville, Tennessee to record his first demos. For the 1998 CBC special Where the River Meets the Sea, a show which featured the top music acts of New Brunswick, Vautour was chosen to represent country music.

Vautour's debut album, J. R. Vautour, was released in 2000 on his own Busy Music record label. His first single, "You're the One," peaked in the Canadian country top 20. "Gettin' Our Feet Wet" spent five weeks at No. 1 on the independent Canadian singles chart. "Dry Eye," the follow-up single, also reached No. 1. Additional singles "Don't Mean Maybe" and "This Time" also reached the Canadian top 20. With his radio success, Vautour began opening for country legends Boxcar Willie and Gene Watson.

Vautour was nominated for Country Music Artist of the Year at the 2001 East Coast Music Awards, and his album was nominated for Album of the Year the Canadian Music Week Awards. At the 2002 Juno Awards, Vautour was nominated for Best New Country Artist. Vautour was also nominated for Independent Male Artist of the Year at the 2002 Canadian Country Music Awards.

Vautour has since released the albums The New Me (2003) and Break (2006), and continued his string of hit singles with songs like "Addicted," "Kiss Me Goodbye," "U Make Me Love U," "Don't Know It Yet" and "The New Me." His latest single, "You Were There," was released in June 2008.

== Discography ==
=== Albums ===
Year	Album
2000	J. R. Vautour
2003	The New Me
2006	Break

=== Singles ===
Year	Title	Album
2000	"You're the One"	J. R. Vautour
2001	"How the End Should Start"	J. R. Vautour
2001	"Gettin' Our Feet Wet"	J. R. Vautour
2002	"Dry Eye"	J. R. Vautour
2002	"Don't Mean Maybe"	J. R. Vautour
2003	"This Time"	J. R. Vautour
2003	"Addicted"	The New Me
2003	"Kiss Me Goodbye"	The New Me
2004	"U Make Me Love U"	The New Me
2005	"Don't Know It Yet"	The New Me
2005	"Do You Remember"	The New Me
2006	"The New Me"	The New Me
2006	"Going Home"	Break
2006	"Weak"	Break
2007	"Hangover"	Break
2007	"Break"	Break
2007	"You Can"	Break
2008	"I Give"	Break
2008	"You Were There"	Break
2008	"Why Me?"	Break

=== Music videos ===
Year	Title	Director
2003	"Addicted"	Randy Saulter
2004	"U Make Me Love U"	Michael Monaco

== Awards and nominations ==
Year	Association	Category	Result
2002	Juno Awards of 2002	Best New Country Artist/Group	Nominated
2002	Canadian Country Music Association	Independent Male Artist of the Year	Nominated
2004	Canadian Country Music Association	Chevy Trucks Rising Star Award	Nominated
2004	Canadian Country Music Association	Independent Male Artist of the Year	Nominated
2004	Canadian Country Music Association	Independent Song of the Year – "Addicted"	Nominated
