= Kayne Taylor =

Australian singer

Kayne Taylor is a pop music singer from Melbourne, Victoria who won the 2004 Australian series of Popstars Live. Taylor started singing in 1994 and can also play bass and guitar.

== Popstars Live ==
Taylor was working for Australia Post when a friend dared him to audition. He did so, becoming a finalist and then the winner. On Popstars Live: The Finalists, Taylor covered "Jealous Guy", first performed by John Lennon and later an Australian number one hit for Roxy Music in 1981. Taylor's show-stopping performance of the INXS song "Never Tear Us Apart" was considered by many to be his finest moment. Other standouts included his unique rendition of "It's Raining Men", as well as the Kylie Minogue and Jason Donovan duet "Especially for You", which was performed, strangely, as a solo.

After winning the series, Taylor entered the studios in early June 2004 to record a debut album. The first single "Heartbreaker" was released on 21 June 2004 and debuted at No. 8 on the Australian singles charts. He co-wrote the song himself. A planned second single, "City Lights", and the album were never released.

== Future direction ==
Taylor moved on from Popstars Live in order to pursue an independent record career. Taylor completed a three-month entertainment contract with the Conrad Hilton in Bangkok. During his time in Bangkok, Taylor got in touch with German producer Leslie Mándoki and subsequently travelled to Germany, where he recorded seven songs in four days. Taylor and Mandoki then began working on Taylor's debut album for Europe.

== Discography ==
=== Singles ===
List of singles, with selected chart positions
Title	Year	Peak chart positions
Title	Year	AUS
"Stand Up Next to Me" (as part of Popstars Live finalists)	2004	29
"Heartbreaker"	2004	8

=== Other appearances ===
- "Jealous Guy" from Popstars Live: The Finalists (2004)

Preceded by Scott Cain	Australian Popstars winner 2004	Succeeded by N/A
