= Julie Crochetière =

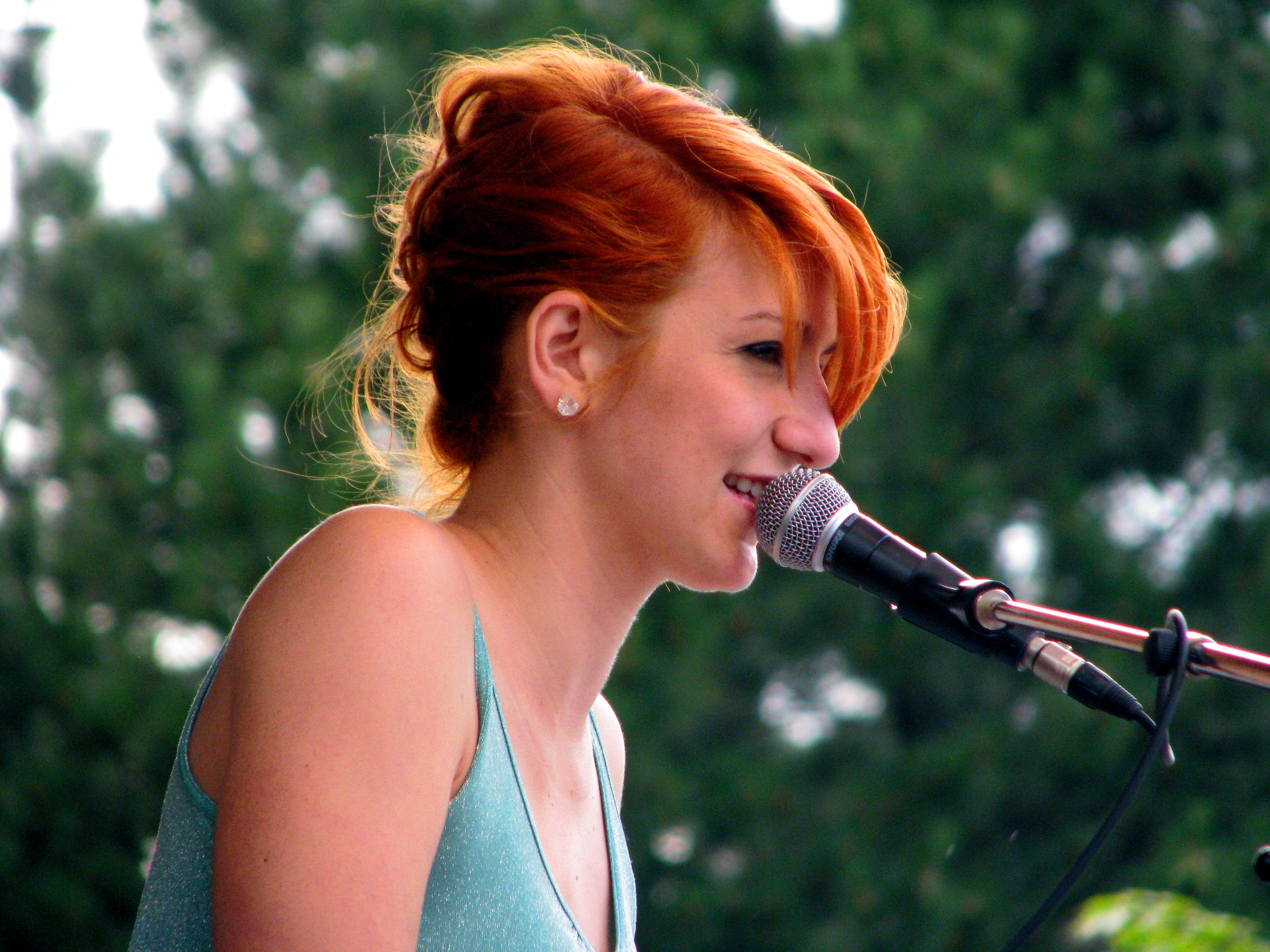

Background information
- Born: July 10, 1980 (age 46); Montreal, Quebec, Canada
- Genres: Pop, rock
- Occupations: Singer, songwriter, musician
- Instruments: Vocals, keyboards
- Years active: 2000–present
- Labels: Universal Avalon/Somerset, Indie Soul
- Formerly of: Sugar Jones
- Website: juliec.com

Julie Crochetière (born July 10, 1980) is a Canadian singer, songwriter, and pianist.

== Career ==
Julie Crochetière began playing piano at the age of six and continued her studies for another eight years. When she was thirteen she wrote her first song. In high school she began developing her singing voice, then studied music for two years at Collège Lionel-Groulx.

In 2000, Crochetière joined the Popstars television series where she became a member of the all-female pop group Sugar Jones.

The band did two national tours and released the album Sugar Jones, which was certified platinum in Canada and contained the top ten hits first "How Much Longer" and "Days Like That". The band was nominated for the 2002 Canadian Radio Music Awards but Sugar Jones disbanded later in the year.

In 2003, Crochetière independently released Café, her first EP. She then performed at Beaches International Jazz Festival in Toronto, Ottawa Jazz Festival, Montreal International Jazz Festival, Canadian Music Week, and the North by Northeast festival.

Crochetière and drummer Tony Albino co-produced her debut album A Better Place (2007). The single "Precious Love" reached No. 18 on the Canadian record chart and was nominated for Best Adult Contemporary Song at the 2009 Canadian Radio Music Awards. The album was the eighth most downloaded album on the R&B chart at iTunes Canada. Crochetière was also nominated Best Female Vocalist at the 2009 Canadian Smooth Jazz Awards.

She performed at the Canadian Songwriters Hall of Fame press conference in 2008. In March 2008, she started her Play it Forward concert series.

In August 2010, Crochetière released the first single from her second solo album "Tomorrow" and a remix package which included a dubstep remix by Alister Johnson, a club mix by Ian Campbell, a radio edit, and a reggae version which was recorded at Tuff Gong Studio in Kingston, Jamaica. In March 2011, she released Steady Ground, her second solo album.

Her third solo album Counting Dreams was nominated for a 2015 Juno Award for Best Vocal Jazz Album of the Year.

== Discography ==
- Cafe (self-released, 2003)
- A Better Place (Avalon, 2007)
- Steady Ground (Indie Soul, 2010)
- Counting Dreams (Vega, 2014)

As a member of Sugar Jones

- Sugar Jones (Universal, 2001)
