= Jeff Johnston Trio =

Canadian jazz formation

- Origin: Newfoundland and Labrador, Canada
- Genres: Jazz
- Years active: 1980s-present
- Members: Jeff Johnston; Fraser Hollins; Rich Irwin
- Past members: Mike Billard; Jim Vivian
- Website: www.jeffjohnstonmusic.com

The Jeff Johnston Trio is a Canadian jazz band from Newfoundland and Labrador, Canada. The trio, consisting of pianist Jeff Johnston, bassist Jim Vivian and drummer Michael Billard, has been nominated for a 2002 Juno Award and a 2000 East Coast Music Award.

== History ==
The Jeff Johnston Trio played its first show in 1983; that year the trio participated in the first Newfoundland Sound Symposium.

The band's album Nuage, recorded in 2001, was nominated for a Juno Award as "Best Contemporary Jazz Instrumental".

In 2013, the group released its fifth recording, Returning, featuring jazz in the style of 1970s and 1980s European pianists.

Johnston has relocated to Montreal, where he has brought together a new group, still called the Jeff Johnston Trio, with bassist Fraser Hollins, and drummer Rich Irwin.

Drummer Mike Billard died on September 1, 2024, at the age of 60.

== Personnel ==
- Jeff Johnston (leader)
- Mike Billard
- Jim Vivian

== Discography ==
- Nuage (2002) (Jeff Johnston, Jim Vivian, Michael Billard, Featuring David Liebman & John Abercrombie)
- Returning (2013) (Jeff Johnston, Jim Vivian, Michael Billard)
