= Scott Cain =

Australian singer and TV presenter

- Born: 2 April 1981 (age 45); Port Macquarie, New South Wales, Australia
- Origin: Perth, Western Australia
- Genre: Pop
- Occupations: Singer; television presenter; entertainer; furniture polisher
- Instrument: Vocals
- Years active: 2000–present
- Label: Warner

Scott Cain (born 2 April 1981) is an Australian singer and TV presenter. In 2002 he won the third Australian Popstars TV talent competition. His debut solo album, Controlled Folly (October 2002), peaked in the ARIA Albums Chart top 50. Its lead single, "I'm Moving On" (May 2002), reached number one on the related ARIA Singles Chart. While competing on Popstars, the Final 7 contestants released a compilation single with each providing a cover version of Stevie Wonder's "Superstition", which peaked at number seven. His wife, Danielle Stearman, was a fellow contestant on Popstars, the couple have three children together. In 2024 they formed a local cover band together called MixTape Trio with another local musician.

== Biography ==
Scott Cain was born on 2 April 1981 and grew up in Port Macquarie. He attended Port Macquarie Primary School – where he was school captain in his final year – and then Port Macquarie High School where he completed Year 10. He also competed as a skateboarder.

By 2000 Cain was living in Perth where he worked as a furniture polisher and was also lead vocalist in a band, Funkapation. They released an album, Peanut Butter Brick, in 2000 and competed in the Hastings Valley Battle of the Bands earning Cain the award for Best Vocalist. Late in 2001 Cain auditioned for the Australian TV talent competition, Popstars third season. In March 2002 he entered the ARIA Singles Chart with his version of Stevie Wonder's "Superstition", which was featured on a Popstars 3 The Final 7 compilation single – each contestant provided their own version of the track. It peaked at number seven and was certified gold for shipment of 35,000 copies by the end of the year. His first solo single, after winning the competition, was "I'm Moving On", which debuted at number one in May and was also certified gold. His manager was Sloane Howard, the mother of The Kid Laroi.

Despite protest from Cain, his label, Warner Music Australasia, released his second single as "Crazy People Rock", which peaked at number 39. Both of his initial singles were written by Gregg Alexander of the New Radicals. Cain had intended to release "Perfect Day", co-written by himself with Nick Howard, as his second solo single but he was prevented by Warner. His debut album, Controlled Folly, reached number 49. He also released the non-album single "Oceans in Between", a song based upon the events of 11 September 2001. This was a collaboration with Vents limited to 1,000 copies and released only through his website. Scott also performed this song at various charity events.

In 2003, he began hosting the AMTV show on the Disney Channel, and released the song "Step into My World" on a Roadshow compilation. He won Best New Talent at the 2004 ASTRA awards, beating out other finalists including James Mathieson and Andrew G ~ a public vote saw Scott Cain again win the public support for his role on AMTV Disney Channel take him home the award. The following year, Cain signed with ABC Kids and released his second album, Roller Coaster (October 2004). "Perfect Day" appeared on this album. Another album track, "Hilary Duff", received radio airplay and later that year Cain supported the subject of the song, Hilary Duff, on her national Australian tour.

== Personal life ==
In 2002 Scott Cain started dating a fellow Popstars contestant, Danielle Stearman. Stearman also provided her version of "Superstition" for the compilation single and finished second in the contest. Stearman, as Danielle, released a solo single, "Tell Me if You Like It" (July 2002), which reached number 20 on the ARIA Singles chart. Cain and Stearman featured in a music video for the Australian band, The Millionaires, on their track, "Wrong Guy", which Stearman co-wrote with their lead singer, Jordan Cade. Cain and Stearman issued a duet album, Spero, in 2009. In 2011, they got engaged and had a son. In 2015, they were married in Las Vegas and in 2017 had a daughter. In 2022 they welcomed another daughter. Cain now has four children – the first was born when he was 19. In 2024 they formed a local cover band called MixTape Trio with another local musician.

== Discography ==
=== Studio albums ===
Title	Details	Peak chart positions
Title	Details	AUS
Peanut Butter Brick (as Funkapation)	Released: June 30 2000 . BlueLotus Production Distribution via Sanity Music; Formats: CD	—
Controlled Folly	Released: September 2002; Label: WEA (0927492362); Formats: CD	49
Roller Coaster	Released: October 2004; Label: ABC Kids (300984-2); Formats: CD	—
Spero (With Danielle Stearman)	Released: 2009	—

=== Singles ===
==== As lead artist ====
List of singles released as lead artist
Title	Year	Peak chart positions	Certifications	Album
Title	Year	AUS	Certifications	Album
"I'm Moving On"	2002	1	ARIA: Gold	Controlled Folly
"Crazy People Rock"	2002	39		Controlled Folly
"Step into My World"	2003	—		Roller Coaster
"Hilary Duff"	2004	—		Roller Coaster

==== As featured artist ====
List of singles released as lead artist
Title	Year	Peak chart positions
Title	Year	AUS
"Superstition" (featured on single with Final 7 of Popstars)	2002	7

Preceded by Scandal'us	Australian Popstars winner 2002	Succeeded by Kayne Taylor
