= Escarcha =

Colombian female Latin pop group

- Origin: Colombia
- Genres: Latin pop
- Years active: 2002–2004
- Labels: Sony

Escarcha was a Colombian female latin pop group that was formed out of Popstars in 2002. Escarcha disbanded in 2004.

The band members were:

- Natalia Bedoya
- Carolina Gaitán
- Isa Katherine Mosquera
- Laura Mayolo
- Vanessa Noriega

Their first album, the self-titled Escarcha, sold 20,000 copies on its first day and more than 70,000 copies in the three weeks after the album was released. They also had a supporting tour for their first album. The group released a second album, but it did not chart not as well as the first nor had the same level of promotion. In 2004, the group dissolved. Band members Natalia Bedoya and Isa Katherine Mosquera continued their careers on TV and radio respectively. Carolina Gaitán became a television actress.

== Discography ==
Albums:

- Escarcha
- Siempre Hay Algo Más
