= Popstars (Mexican TV series) =

- Created by: Jonathan Dowling
- Country of origin: Mexico
- No. of seasons: 1

Original release
- Network: Televisa
- Release: 2002

Popstars was a Mexican reality television series based on the Popstars international series. In Mexico, Popstars was broadcast on the Mexican Televisa channel in 2002. The program was discontinued after one season.

In the only season of the show, candidates competed for a place in a new girl group. The five finalists that won were Mary Betty (real name María León), Christian (full name Christian Mirelle), Lorena (full name Lorena Fajardo), Ana Brenda (full name Ana Brenda Contreras) and Nancy (Nancy Mendez). Together, they formed the girl group T' De Tila.

Their first song, "Dejarte ir" (also their only official music video), only gave them brief success. They followed it up with a studio album T' De Tila released on October 13, 2002 that included hits like "Tomate" and "Aqui estoy" in addition to "Dejarte ir". the songs of the album were written by Áureo Baqueiro, Aleks Syntek, Mario Domm and others.

After break-up, Christian continued with a singing career in the States, María León became a vocalist of Playa Limbo, Ana Brenda Contreras branched into acting on television notably in the TV series Teresa, whereas Lorena Fajardo immigrated to Sweden marrying there and continuing her very successful career there.
