= Sparx (Indonesian band) =

SparX
- Origin: Indonesia
- Genres: Pop; Dance; R&B
- Years active: 2003–present
- Label: Warner Music Indonesia
- Members: Dandy Sosiawan Ginanjar Dini Alamanda Arizully Handiyanto Godjali "Andy Lee" Jelita Elsa Tanjung Josiah Joko "Jojo" Iswanto

SparX is the pop group formed by the top five winners of the first season of Popstars Indonesia in 2003. They launched their self-titled debut album in 2004, spawning a one-hit wonder Sayangi Aku Apa Adanya. The name SparX originates from the word sparkling to reflect the sparkle in the talent of each member.

== Recent Activity ==
Popstars Indonesia has not launched another season since. The band members are still bound to a 10-year contract with Popstars, but to date has no scheduled recording projects or public appearances as a band. However, the band has not yet disbanded and its members are known to say that they are currently "assembling material for their next album", whose due date is yet unannounced. The members are currently working other jobs individually, including singing at shows, acting for movies and TV, supporting recording projects for more prominent artists, side projects in Contemporary Christian Music and Performing Arts, hosting shows, managing a record shop, and teaching kindergarten.

== Members ==
- Dandy Sosiawan Ginanjar
- Dini Alamanda Arizully
- Handiyanto Godjali "Andy Lee"
- Jelita Elsa Tanjung
- Josiah Joko "Jojo" Iswanto
