= Mambrú =

Argentine pop band

- Origin: Buenos Aires, Argentina
- Genres: Pop, Latin
- Years active: 2002– 2005
- Label: BMG
- Past members: Pablo Silberberg; Germán Tripel; Emanuel Ntaka; Gerónimo Rauch; Milton Amadeo
- Website: Official website

Mambrú was a male pop group from Buenos Aires, Argentina. They saw both local and international success from 2002 until 2005 when they disbanded. The group's debut album, released in October 2002, had become a triple platinum record by 2003. During the following years, Mambrú became one of the most successful pop acts in Argentina, embarking on a Latin American tour and releasing two more albums: Creciendo (2003) and Mambrú 3 (2005). The group received a number of accolades, including three Gardel Awards and a Martín Fierro Award.

== History ==
The band was formed in May 2002, following the outcome of a reality TV show Popstars. Over 4,000 young men auditioned in the Club Hípico Argentino, and in October 2002 the final selection released their first album, self-titled Mambrú, which went triple platinum selling over 120,000 units.

They went on to release two more albums, and performed live throughout the country. In December 2002, they performed a joint concert with Bandana in José Amalfitani Stadium. In July 2003, Milton Amadeo left the band to pursue a solo career. The remaining four continued, achieving awards which included Premios Gardel- Best Album for a Breakthrough Group, Premios Gardel- Best Album for a Pop Group, Martín Fierro- Best TV-Formed Group. They went on to tour in both Paraguay and Chile, and culminated with a nationwide tour of Argentina entitled Cantarte (To Sing To You). They played in every single Argentine province, in a tour that spanned 2004-2005. Their aim was to 'sing to the entire country', and local bands were recruited to work as supporting artists in their various hometowns.

In August 2005 they disbanded, citing a desire to pursue solo careers.

== Members ==
The band originally consisted of 5 members:

- Pablo Silberberg
- Germán Tripel (Tripa)
- Emanuel Ntaka (Manu)
- Gerónimo Rauch (Gero)
- Milton Amadeo

Amadeo left the band in 2003 to pursue a solo career.

== Discography ==
- Mambrú - October 2002
- Creciendo - July 2003
- Mambrú 3 - December 2004
