= Velvet Empire =

Canadian musical group

- Origin: Toronto, Ontario, Canada
- Genres: Pop
- Years active: 2002–2003
- Labels: Universal Music Canada
- Past members: Alex Price; Justin Humes; Janelle Belgrave; Lacey Block; Ryan Hamilton

Velvet Empire was a Canadian pop music group that was formed through the second edition of the Global TV show Popstars, entitled "Boy Meets Girl". The group was formed in Spring 2002. They recorded their first and only album in Toronto at Metalworks Recording Studio.

The group were winners of a 10-month competition, intended to form a pop group comprising both males and females. Its members were Alex Price, Justin Humes, Janelle Belgrave, Lacey Block and Ryan Hamilton. The new group called itself Velvet Empire and released an album, Velvet Empire, and single, "Frontin' On Me", in 2002. Despite the single receiving much radio and video play, the album's sales were not as expected. As a result, the group disbanded by 2003.

== Band members ==
- Alex Price was born in Vancouver, British Columbia, on February 14, 1980. She is a citizen of both Canada and Australia since both of her parents are Australian. Price has always been interested in the arts starting with dance. She discovered her singing ability when she was 11 years old. She joined the school choir and began to learn the basics of singing. In 1993, she moved with her mother to Oregon where she attended The Delphian School. She became involved in musical theater there and recorded her first song.

Price was influenced by Lauryn Hill, Sarah McLachlan, Jack Johnson, Ella Fitzgerald, K-OS, John Mayer, Fiona Apple, Pearl Jam, and India.Arie.

- Justin Humes was born in Montreal, Quebec, on December 23, 1979. he speaks fluent English and French. Music has always been a huge part of his life. At high school, Humes was a member of the Montreal-based band, Ryde. He left the band to join Popstars and Velvet Empire. Humes attended McGill University from 1999 to 2001, majoring in environmental studies. He also plays drums and guitar.
- Janelle Belgrave was born in Toronto, Ontario, on May 20, 1983. She is from a culturally diverse background. Her mother is Filipino and her father is Bajan. Belgrave started singing when she was only three years old and she started dancing when she was four. She has studied ballet, jazz and tap. She attended the Etobicoke School of the Arts, majoring in musical theater, and has participated in school musicals. Belgrave loves sports and was the captain of the basketball and volleyball teams. She is currently recording for her solo career.
- Lacey Block was born in Lethbridge, Alberta, on April 30, 1983. She has a very strong musical background. She plays piano and has been composing songs since she was seven. Block was enrolled in the jazz program at Humber College as both a vocalist and pianist, before leaving to join Velvet Empire. She does karate, draws and writes poetry.
- Ryan Hamilton was born on October 3, 1982, in Edmonton, Alberta. He was home schooled from grade five to grade nine, to allow more time to focus on traveling and singing. Hamilton went back to high school where he graduated from Percy Page High School in Edmonton in 2000. Singing has always been a huge part of his life. He moved to Calgary in 2000 to attend school when his father's job caused the family to relocate to the United States.

== Discography ==
- Velvet Empire (2002) is the band's only full album. The album contains the band's single, "Frontin' on Me", but was not as commercially successful as hoped and the group disbanded shortly after its release.

Track listing

1. "Are You Ready?... Then Let's Begin" - 0:21
2. "Frontin' on Me" - 3:32
3. "I" - 3:40
4. "Wha, Wha, What" - 3:02
5. "Mad for You" - 3:34
6. "Tell Me" - 4:19
7. "Now You Don't" - 3:36
8. "Ride" - 3:55
9. "Good Girls" - 3:49
10. "About Last Night" - 3:35
11. "2 A.M." - 4:12
12. "That's Right" - 3:55
13. "Wild Horses" - 5:12
