= That Girl (Miranda Murphy song) =

Single by Miranda Murphy
- Released: July 2004
- Length: 3:28
- Label: UMA
- Songwriter(s): Trevor Steel, Anders Kallmark

"That Girl" is the debut and only single by Australian singer Miranda Murphy, who appeared on the Australian series Popstars Live in 2004. The song peaked at number 19 on the ARIA charts.

== Video ==
A video was released to promo the single, in which she dresses up as artists such as Madonna, Avril Lavigne, Kylie Minogue, Christina Aguilera and Britney Spears.

== Track listing ==
CD single (9821604)

1. "That Girl" - 3:38
2. "That Girl" (Instrumental) - 3:38

== Charts ==
Chart (2004)	Peak position
Australia (ARIA)	19
