= Tell Me If You Like It =

Single by Danielle
- Released: July 2002
- Recorded: Sydney
- Studio: Studio M and Tiger Studios, Sydney
- Genre: Pop
- Length: 3:29
- Label: WEA Records
- Songwriter(s): Darren Dowlut, Dennis Dowlut

"Tell Me If You Like It" is the debut and only single by Australian singer Danielle Stearman (under the mononymous name of Danielle), who appeared on the third series of Australian Popstars in 2002. The song peaked at number 20 on the ARIA charts.

== Track listings ==
Main single (0927481932)

1. "Tell Me If You Like It" - 3:29
2. "Piece of My Heart" - 3:50
3. "Superstition" (Felix Remix) - 7:32

The Remixes (0927488982)

1. "Tell Me If You Like It" (Supafly Radio Remix)
2. "Tell Me If You Like It" (Deep 'N Dark Remix)
3. "Tell Me If You Like It" (Supafly Dub Mix)
4. "Tell Me If You Like It" (Supafly Club Mix)

== Charts ==
Chart (2002)	Peak position
Australia (ARIA)	20
