= Controlled Folly =

Studio album by Scott Cain
- Released: 30 September 2002
- Recorded: 2002
- Genre: Pop
- Length: 44:15
- Label: WEA Records
- Producer: Michael Szumowski

Scott Cain chronology
Controlled Folly (2002)	Roller Coaster (2004)

Singles from Controlled Folly
- 1. "I'm Moving On" Released: 6 May 2002; 2. "Crazy People Rock" Released: 19 August 2002

Controlled Folly is the debut studio album by Scott Cain, winner of the third and final series of Popstars Australia in 2002. The album was released in September 2002 and debuted and peaked at number 49 on the ARIA Charts.

== Track listing ==
1. "I'm Moving On" – 3:32
2. "Feeling So Right" – 3:58
3. "Perfect Day" – 3:59
4. "The Right Time" – 3:55
5. "Crazy People Rock" – 3:22
6. "Gotta Get You Back" – 3:57
7. "Can't Deny It" – 3:39
8. "Give It to Me Baby" – 3:48
9. "Coming Up for Air" – 3:37
10. "Sunshine Superman" – 3:34
11. "Get Back in the Groove" – 3:31
12. "On the Dancefloor" (bonus track) – 3:23

== Charts ==
Chart (2002)	Peak position
Australian Albums (ARIA)	49
