= Lollipop (Italian band) =

Italian girl group

- Lollipop in 2003. From left: Marta Falcone, Dominique Fidanza, Roberta Ruiu, Marcella Ovani, Veronica Rubino.

Background information
- Origin: Italy
- Genres: Pop; Dance; Europop
- Years active: 2001–2004, 2013, 2017–2018, 2026–present
- Labels: WEA Records / Warner Music Italy (2001–2004); Get Over Records (2013–2018)
- Members: Marcella Ovani; Marta Falcone; Veronica Rubino
- Past members: Roberta Ruiu; Dominique Fidanza
- Website: lollipop.warnermusic.it

Lollipop is an Italian girl group formed in 2001 on the Italian version of Popstars (which originated in New Zealand), a precursor to the Idols shows. They sing mainly in English although they recorded three songs in Italian.

In spring 2004, the band announced they would no longer perform together, after being dropped by their record label.

In 2013, the group reunited as a quartet and started a first reunion with a new single: Ciao (Reload) and a comeback tour.

In 2017, the group reunited again, but as a trio. They released the single Ritmo Tribale in 2018 and began a promotional tour.

== Biography ==
Lollipop were an Italian group performing on the pop scene between 2001 and 2004. The members were Dominique Fidanza (Domy), Marcella Ovani (Marcellina), Marta Falcone, Roberta Ruiu and Veronica Rubino. They debuted with a single that stayed in singles chart many weeks, and in just its first four weeks it sold over 100,000 copies, an enormous success for a single in the Italian music market which is traditionally much more concentrated on album sales. They then released their debut album, Popstars, which spawned the follow-up single "Don't Leave Me Now" (number 9 on the single chart) and their third single "When The Rain", a ballad conceived for the Christmas market whose video was their first to be broadcast on MTV and reached No. 3 on TRL. The single charted in the Top 20. During the summer the group performed in many Italian discos and clubs with the Popstar 2001 Tour.

In March 2002 the group took part in the Sanremo Music Festival with their first song in Italian, "Batte Forte", after which they were highly criticized by the press, above all because of their poor live performance. The single was also included in the re-release of their first album, Popstars Remixed, featuring a second CD with the remixed versions of all their songs, "Batte Forte" included. During the summer of the same year, the group embarked on the Popstars 2002 Tour all over Italy.

In March 2003 they released their second single in Italian "Credi A Me", which was featured in the Italian-dubbed version of the Disney movie The Jungle Book 2.

The group decided to take a break and only in January 2004 released their second album Together, which spawned two singles "Dreaming of love" and the digital single "You". The album, released without any promotion by WEA, didn't gain much success and the group broke up after being dropped by their record label.

In 2006 Dominique Fidanza took part in the French TV show Star Academy, ranking second. Throughout 2007 and 2008 she recorded her first solo album with songs in French and a couple in Italian. Unfortunately, she never had the chance to release it because of cuts in her record label that eventually caused her to be dropped. Recently, she released her first single in French, "La Place Du Passager", along with an Italian version called "Spaghetti e Desideri". After two promotional singles: "Un papillon une étoile" in 2011 and "Oui ou Non" in 2012, she finally released her first solo album Solipsiste in 2013.

Marta Falcone released some solo songs on her official MySpace page in 2007. In July 2009 Marta released her debut solo single "Vera e Severa". She released a series of singles in 2010: "Never Alone", "Mon Voyage", "Sunrise" and she recorded some Latin songs for Latin music compilations.

In 2007 Roberta Ruiu released some songs like "Don't be Afraid" and an English cover of "Non è solo un'emozione" – "You'll See". Roberta collaborated with Hotel Saint George for a dance track "You Can Trust in Me" with the pseudonym Tiffany. In 2012 she took part in the popular reality show Uomini e donne.

In November 2009 rumors started to circulate about the group reforming for the release of a new single in order to say thank you to all the people who supported them throughout the years.

On 4 February 2010 Lollipop performed together at the TV show Matricole & Meteore on Italia 1 with Nicola Savino and Juliana Moreira. In 2011 they made another appearance on I migliori anni on Rai 1 with Carlo Conti.

=== Reunion 2013 ===
In March 2013, the band announced their comeback as a quartet, as Dominique Fidanza expressed no interest in joining the reunion. The group started a promotional tour on many Italian TV Shows and performed in important clubs throughout the country. As a result, their first album Popstars and the single "Batte Forte" re-entered the iTunes chart, reaching the Top 20. On 9 June 2013 the band premiered their comeback single "Ciao (Reload)" during a performance at Just Cavalli, a popular club in Milan. The single, produced by international DJ and producer Mario Fargetta a.k.a. GETFAR, was officially released on 21 June 2013.

In October 2013, the group announced on their Facebook page that they would record a new single, but the project did not materialize, and the group went to hiatus.

=== Reunion 2017–2018 ===
On 18 March 2015, Marta Falcone and Roberta Ruiu have participated as special guests in the Rai2 TV program Emozioni.

On 29 June 2017, Lollipop competed in Canale 5 TV program The Winner Is ... as a trio formed by Marcella Ovani, Veronica Rubino and Marta Falcone, without Fidanza and Ruiu. The group, which was challenging against Alessandro Canino, decides to withdraw from the race after performing. They have received, as required by the regulation of the program, a cash prize to be invested for new musical projects.

On 17 January 2018, the group appeared on Italia 1 TV program 90 Special: Lollipop during the show performed their biggest hit, "Down Down Down", and officially confirmed the release of a new single. They released the single "Ritmo Tribale" on 26 April 2018. The day itself the group promoted the single appearing on Canale 5 TV program Pomeriggio Cinque, one of Italy's most important TV shows. On 1 May 2018, they released the official music video. Lollipop began then a promotional tour that brought them into the most important Italian clubs and festivals of various kinds.

=== Reunion 2026 ===
In 2026, the trio reunited once again to celebrate the 25th anniversary of their debut single, "Down Down Down", launching the Say Now Tour 2026 and announcing the release of their new single, "Say Now", scheduled for June 19, 2026.

== Discography ==
=== Albums ===
- Popstars (2001) #14 ITA
- Popstars Remixed (2002) #78 ITA
- Together (2004) #80 ITA

=== Singles ===
- " Down Down Down" (2001) #1 ITA
- "Don’t Leave Me Now" (2001) #9 ITA
- "When The Rain" (2001) #17 ITA
- "Batte Forte" (2002) #9 ITA
- "Credi A Me" (2003) #42 ITA
- "Dreaming of Love" (2004) #50 ITA
- "You" (2004)
- "Ciao (Reload)" (2013) #21 ITA
- "Ritmo Tribale" (2018)
- "Say Now" (2026)
