= Sugar Jones (album) =

Studio album by Sugar Jones
- Released: June 26, 2001
- Recorded: 2001
- Studio: Metalworks Studios (Mississauga); Soundproof Recording Studios (Toronto)
- Genre: Pop, R&B
- Length: 49:45
- Label: Universal Music Group

Sugar Jones is the only studio album by Canadian pop and R&B girl group Sugar Jones. The album's first single "Days Like That", sold 8,762 copies in the first week of release and reached atop the Canadian Singles Chart. The album was released on June 26, 2001, and was a commercial success, debuting at number 2 on the Canadian Albums Chart and being certified platinum. Singles "Days Like That" and "How Much Longer" were among the top 100 most played radio tracks in Canada in 2001; #22 and #42, respectively.

== Track listing ==
1. "Days Like That"
2. "How Much Longer"
3. "If You"
4. "Keep on Walking"
5. "Never Leave Hurt Alone"
6. "It's Like Ice Cream"
7. "Baby Boo"
8. "Get Yourself Together"
9. "I Got U (feat. Toya Alexis)"
10. "A Little Bit of Heaven"

– Bonus Tracks-

1. "Days Like That (feat. Solitair) (Baby Silver Refix)"
2. "How Much Longer (French version)"

== Charts ==
Chart (2001)	Peak position
Canadian Albums (Billboard)	2
