= Popstars 2015 =

Final season of television series

- Starring: Miss Platnum; Stefanie Heinzmann; Bella Garcia
- Country of origin: Germany
- No. of episodes: 8

Production
- Camera setup: Multi-camera
- Running time: 96 minutes

Original release
- Network: RTL II
- Release: 17 August – 10 October 2015

Related
- Popstars: Der Weg ist das Ziel

Popstars 2015 was the eleventh and final season of the German reality TV series Popstars, in which aspiring female singers aged 16 or older competed for a place in a new band. The show returned to its original broadcaster RTL II, which aired seasons 1 and 2 of the show. With the previous bands lacking success, the production intended to return to the show's roots and focus more on the singing and the search for different types of singers. The show aired on Mondays at 8:15 pm. Due to very low ratings, it was moved to 9:15 pm. However, ratings continued to drop and the show was kicked off the prime-time and moved to a slot airing Saturdays at 6:00 pm.

== Changes ==
In this season, the casting phase was skipped; instead, the producers looked for talented girls all over Germany using social media and YouTube. In the end, 27 girls were invited to audition in front of the jury. After each contestant gave a solo singing performance and participated in group choreography, the jury chose 18 girls to enter the POPSTARS Academy.

"POPSTARS Academy"

Instead of the Workshop phase introduced in earlier seasons, the girls entered the POPSTARS Academy. During their 8-week stay at the Academy, the contestants worked on their singing and dancing skills, songs for their future band, performed as groups in front of the judges, faced eliminations, and got ready for their future life as a band.

== Contestants ==
(Ages stated are at time of contest)

Name	Age	Hometown
Alena	16	Schwäbisch Gmünd
Christin	24	Cottbus
Gabriela	27	Vienna, Austria
Gina Christin	17	Syke
Ina	23	Bad Griesbach
Larissa	18	Herzebrock
Laura	21	Oberhausen
Nadja	23	Rostock
Nini	23	Vienna, Austria
Patricia	17	Düsseldorf
Pauline	16	Mühlhausen
Sabrina	23	Berlin
Selina	21	Vienna, Austria
Sophie	17	Kleinmachnow
Terry-Joe	16	Hamburg
Timea	20	Tübingen
Ulana	22	Berlin
Veneranda	19	Hanau
Lorena	20	Schweinfurt
Ludivine	20	Saarbrücken
Maria	25	Bitterfeld
Mariam	17	Berlin
Ramona	16	Berlin
Susanne	20	Vienna, Austria
Susanne	19	Hamburg
Svenja	22	Landstuhl
Virginia	25	Saarbrücken

== Judge's Call-out order ==
Judge's Call-out Order
Order	Episodes							
Order	1	2	3	4	5	6	7	8
1	Nadja	Laura	Alena	Sophie	Gabriela	Alena	Sabrina	Sabrina
2	Virginia	Gabriela	Terry-Joe	Selina	Nadja	Patricia	Selina	Alena
3	Gina Christin	Nini	Pauline	Timea	Sabrina	Sabrina	Alena	Timea
4	Timea	Larissa	Laura	Veneranda	Selina	Nadja	Veneranda	Selina
5	Alena	Pauline	Gabriella	Terry-Joe	Terry-Joe	Selina	Timea	Veneranda
6	Ramona	Nadja	Nadja	Sabrina	Alena	Gabriela	Patricia	Patricia
7	Gabriela	Selina	Sabrina	Laura	Timea	Veneranda	Nadja	
8	Mariam	Alena	Selina	Alena	Patricia	Terry-Joe		
9	Veneranda	Veneranda	Sophie	Nadja	Veneranda	Timea		
10	Sabrina	Ulana	Ina	Patricia	Ina	Sophie		
11	Ludivine	Sophie	Ulana	Gabriela	Sophie			
12	Sophie	Patricia	Veneranda	Pauline				
13	Larissa	Sabrina	Patricia	Ina				
14	Susanne	Ina	Timea					
15	Terry-Joe	Timea	Larissa					
16	Ina	Terry-Joe						
17	Patricia	Christin						
18	Laura	Gina Christin						
19	Lorena							
20	Selina							
21	Ulana							
22	Christin							
23	Svenja							
24	Susanne							
25	Pauline							
26	Maria							
27	Nini							

The contestant was eliminated
The contestant quit the competition
The contestant advanced without performing cause of sickness
The contestant won the competition

- In episode 2, Gina Christin quit the competition, and took no part in judging or call-out.
- In episode 3, Alena was sick, and took no part in judging or call-out.
- In episode 4, Ina was sick, and took no part in judging or call-out. The episode ended in a cliffhanger with Ina not learning her verdict until the beginning of the next episode.
- In episode 7, Nadja quit the competition, and took no part in judging or call-out. Despite that, no one was eliminated.

== Episodes ==
=== Episode 01: Auditions ===
Aired on 17 August 2015

After an intensive selection process 27 young women compete to kick off the new "Popstars" season and compete for the coveted places in the academy. Some candidates get right away an opportunity to sing for the jury, while others still have time until the next day to prepare. Friendships start to blossom – but the nervousness increases. The next day after the audition Bella Garcia checked the dance talent of the young women. During an intense choreography training some of them stand out, others have little experience in the dance hall and find it difficult. The candidates rehearse the choreography and eventually perform the choreography in groups in front of the jury. Following Stefanie, Miss Platnum and Bella retire for deliberation to decide which 18 girls will enter the Academy and which 9 will be eliminated.

Advanced to next week: Alena, Christin, Gabriela, Gina Christin, Ina, Larissa, Laura, Nadja, Nini, Patricia, Pauline, Sabrina, Selina, Sophie, Terry -Jo, Timea, Ulana and Veneranda.

Eliminated: Maria, Virginia, Svenja, Susi, Susanne, Ramona, Mariam, Ludivine and Lorena

=== Episode 02: Interpretation ===
Aired on 24 August 2015

The Academy life begins: Following a timetable train the remaining girls in their group songs, share the verses on each other and practice the choreography for her appearance in the first decision show. Candidates learn their new coaches know: vocal coach are Jini Meyer, singer of the band Luxuslärm, and a native of New York Pamela Falcon. Bella Garcia gets support from dance coach Pepita Maria Bauhardt from Berlin.

In a rehearsal room set, the participants meet Miss Platnum and Stefanie Heinzmann. The two jurors jam with the girls, interpret them together with different songs and learn as the voices of the girls know. The two professional singers give valuable advice to each of the young musicians. In a jury hour the girls share in small rounds with Stefanie Heinzmann and speak for the first time about their concerns and desires. Miss Platnum in turn supports the girls in the Vocal Sessions and works closely with the various groups.

At the end of the second episode, the first decision show is on. Just before the show one of the candidates leaves voluntarily. Will she support her band members on the stage or have the remaining girls to divide the song again and shortly develop a different performance? Who needs to leave the Academy at this early stage again.

Songs performed this week

- Cro – Traum, performed by Nadja, Larissa and Pauline
- OutKast – Hey Ya!, performed Veneranda, Ulana and Sophie
- Calvin Harris feat. Ellie Goulding – Outside, performed by Gabriella, Laura and Nini
- Rihanna – Stay, performed by Ina, Sabrina and Patricia
- Macklemore & Ryan Lewis – Can't Hold Us, performed by Timea, Terry-Joe and Christin
- Swedish House Mafia – Don't You Worry Child, performed by Selina and Alena

Advanced to next week: Gabriella, Laura, Sabrina, Ina, Patricia, Selina, Alena, Timea, Terry-Jo, Larissa, Pauline, Nadja, Veneranda, Ulana and Sophie.

Left voluntary: Gina-Christin

Eliminated: Nini and Christin

=== Episode 03: Sarah Connor Playlist ===
Aired on 31 August 2015

Guest Star/Coach: Sarah Connor

A big surprise for the candidates: none other than pop star Sarah Connor welcomed the girls via Skype and announced to them the weekly task: They will perform some pieces from her new album "Muttersprache". Then the girls work out the songs and learn the choreography with the support of a juror Bella Garcia and Coach Pepita Maria Bauhardt. The absolute highlight for the candidates is a personal vocal coaching session with Sarah Connor. Sarah Connor is extremely pleased by a group and said: "You are for me the band"

In addition, the girls now attend a daily endurance training with Bella Garcia and have the opportunity to interact in a jury-appointment with Miss Platnum. Overall it is a very emotive week. Even in dance training with Pepita flow a lot of tears and for another emotional moment also ensures juror Stefanie Heinzmann: She hands the girl letters of their relatives and friends. After that there's no holding back ...

At the end of the third episode the girls enter another decision Show. performs with her band at the beginning of the title "Kommst Du Mit Mir" from her hit album "Muttersprache". Thereafter, the candidates will present their songs in front of the jury. Stefanie Heinzmann is in this case, represented by Jini Meyer, singer of the band Luxuslärm. May this time all candidates remain at the Academy? Or will a couple of them leave the academy?

Songs performed this week

- Kommst du mit Ihr – performed by Sarah Connor, guest star performance
- Wie schön du bist – performed by Nadja, Selina, Sabrina and Gabriella
- Anorak – performed by Timea, Patricia, Veneranda and Larissa
- Heaven – performed by Ulana, Ina and Sophie
- Something's Got a Hold on Me – Christina Aguilera version – performed by Laura, Terry-Joe and Pauline
- Money on My Mind – performed by Nadja, Selina, Sabrina and Gabriella
- Keine ist wie du – performed by Ulana, Ina and Sophie
- Skin on Skin – performed by Timea, Patricia, Veneranda and Larissa
- Bedingungslos – performed by Laura, Terry-Joe and Pauline

Advanced to next week: Patricia, Timea, Veneranda, Pauline, Laura, Terry-Joe, Sabrina, Selina, Nadja, Gabriella, Ina and Sophie

Advanced to next week without performing cause of sickness: Alena

Eliminated: Ulana and Larissa

=== Episode 04: Girlband vs Boyband ===
Aired on 7 September 2015

The motto of the fourth episode: Girlband vs. Boyband. In addition, for the first time the decision show takes place in front of live audience and the girls learn about healthy eating and improve their English skills.

Again during week 4 pretty much is demanded from the Contestants: They need to learn sophisticated choreography for Girl- and boyband songs and in addition to the normal endurance training with Bella and Pepita an extra training is with the Flying Steps is scheduled. In addition, the girls visit TV chef Ole Plogstedt. There they learn about healthy eating and, above all need what foods artist on strenuous tours to stay fit. Together with Ole Plogstedt prepare the girls to four different healthy dishes.

The girls also work on their English skills. Together with an English teacher Nick Karry they go through their lyrics, work on their pronunciation and learn to master English tongue twisters.

Several of the candidates begin to sicken and a girl even falls completely out of the decision show. What to do?

At the end of this episode, the contestants perform the first time in front of the live audiences. Many family members and friends have come to support their loved ones. Before and after the show tearful reunions happen. As opening act of the decision show the Flying Steps come with their piece "Flying Bach" and show all their dancing skills. Divided into four groups performing the girls their Girl- and boyband songs. Who can convince the strict jury and who needs to turn their backs on the Academy?

Songs performed this week

- Buttons, performed by Veneranda, Laura, Terry-Joe and Sabrina
- Overload, performed by Patricia, Alena and Nadja
- Pray to God, performed by Gabriella, Pauline and Nadja (Note: Sabrina and Nadja replaced a sick Ina in the group with Gabriella and Pauline, performing three times in episode 4.)
- I Want You Back, performed by Timea, Sophie and Selina
- One Sweet Day, performed by Sabrina, Terry-Joe, Laura and Veneranda
- Everybody (Backstreet's Back), performed by Gabriella, Pauline and Sabrina
- No Scrubs, performed by Timea, Selina and Sophie
- King, performed by Patricia, Alena and Nadja

Advanced to next week: Patricia, Timea, Veneranda, Alena, Sabrina, Selina, Nadja, Sophie, Terry-Joe and Gabriella,

Decision not announced, the Contestant didn't perform cause of sickness: Ina

Eliminated: Laura and Pauline

=== Episode 05: Deutsche Songs ===
Aired on 14 September 2015

Guest Star/Coaches: Glasperlenspiel

In the fifth episode of "Popstars" everything revolves around the theme of "German songs" and as a reward three girls may accompany Stefanie Heinzmann to a gig in Switzerland. As guest stars this "Glasperlenspiel" come to the Popstars-Academy.

In week 5 of "Popstars" German songs are in the center of attention. In a workshop led by judge Miss Platnum, the candidates themselves write German songs. And that's harder than you might think at first. The girls show the results in front of this time's guest stars, the duo "Glasperlenspiel". In the decision show that again takes place in front of a live audience, Glasperlenspiel are also performing their current title " Geiles Leben". But the sport is not neglected: In addition to a freestyle dance coaching with Pepita there is a yoga session yoga teacher Janina.

But a special highlight is the joint appearance with juror Stefanie Heinzmann at the Gurten Festival in Switzerland. Therefore, three Popstars contestants accompany her, who most excelled and developed during their training at the Academy.

Meanwhile, back at the academy the situation escalates: All home residents have a problem with a certain candidate. Because the girls can not solve the conflict itself, two of them are looking for help with a juror Bella Garcia. Can she help them?

The result is again a decision show in front of a live audience, in which the candidates perform into three groups split two German titles and give their best. Who is allowed to continue his education and who needs to pack their bags?

Songs performed this week:

- Geiles Leben, performed by Glasperlenspiel
- Machin, performed by Nadja, Sabrina and Gabriela
- Hungrieges Herz, performed by Nadja, Sabrina and Gabriela
- Wenn du lebst, performed by Ina, Sophie, Patricia and Veneranda
- Mädchen, performed by Ina, Sophie, Patricia and Veneranda
- Auf anderen Wegen, performed by Timea, Selina, Alena and Terry-Joe
- Au Revoir, performed by Timea, Selina, Alena and Terry-Joe

Contestant advanced to this week after decision wasn't announced last week: Ina

Advanced to next week: Gabriella, Nadja, Sabrina, Selina, Terry-Joe, Alena, Timea, Patricia, Veneranda and Sophie

Eliminated: Ina

=== Episode 06: Big Female Voices ===
Aired on 21 September 2015

The sixth episode of "Popstars" is going under the motto "Big Female Voices". In addition The Canadian singer-songwriter Carly Rae Jepsen comes to the Academy and sings her smash hit "I Really Like You" together with the candidates.

In week 6 of "Popstars" the candidates deal with "Big Female Voices" like Adele and Rihanna. In addition to the usual dance and vocal coaching, this week features a high-heel training with dancers Christoph Jonas. Even first tears start showing ...

A candidate receives an intensive individual coaching with dance trainer Pepita Bauhardt and Luxuslärm frontwoman Jini Meyer. Both are not satisfied with the development and see the girl definitely a loose candidate.

In a video analysis with Stefanie Heinzmann and Pepita Bauhardt the girls for the first time see themselves perform. Especially one of the three band constellations is shocked by their own performance. Will they get their songs and choreography ready for the big decision to show the series?

But this week highlight is the visit of the Canadian singer-songwriter Carly Rae Jepsen. Together with the candidates she performs her world hit "I Really Like You" and presents her latest single "Run Away With Me" in an exclusive a capella version.

In the deciding Show it goes back to all or nothing: The girls enter in groups with two titles of "Big Female Voices" for the best. Who is allowed to continue his education at the Academy and who has to go home?

Songs performed this week:

- Run Away with Me special acoustic version, performed by Carly Rae Jepsen
- I Really Like You, performed by Carly Rae Jepsen and the Popstars Contestants
- I Knew You Were Trouble, performed by Selina, Nadja and Gabriela
- Diamonds, performed by Selina, Nadja and Gabriela
- You've Got the Love, performed by Alena, Patricia and Sabrina
- Read All About It (Part III), performed by Alena, Patricia and Sabrina
- Bang Bang, performed by Timea, Veneranda, Terry-Joe and Sophie
- One & Only, performed by Timea, Veneranda, Terry-Joe and Sophie

Advanced to next week: Alena, Patricia, Sabrina, Nadja, Selina, Veneranda and Timea

Eliminated: Gabriela, Terry-Joe and Sophie

=== Episode 07: Styles ===
Aired on 26 September 2015

The seventh episode of "Popstars" is themed "Styles" and the girls compete for a place in the finals.

In week 7 of "Popstars" the candidates are tasked by the jury to select songs for their performances. Divided into groups, they can choose 2 favorites among five German and five English songs. The song breakdown, the choreography and outfits are determined by the girls themselves. Moreover, they have the opportunity to rehearse with a live band and perform. During rehearsals, the girls have first difficulties to arrange the volumes with the instruments.

In addition, shortly before the finals emotions are cooking high: Especially one of the candidates polarized and ensures disputes among the girls. Another candidate wants to leave the Academy voluntarily – will she leave the Academy so shortly before the finish? Additional a surprise visit, provides tears of joy for one of the girls.

Before the big show the girls can get a makeover by a professional stylist. Lastly, the Decision show is on and it's back to all or nothing: Who can still hope for a place in the band, and for whom has the dream of Popstars faded away?

Songs performed this week:

- Masterpiece, performed by Sabrina, Timea and Patricia
- Sweet Dreams, performed by Veneranda, Selina and Alena
- Halt dich an mir fest, performed by Sabrina, Timea and Patricia
- Ja, performed by Veneranda, Selina and Alena

Advanced to next Week: Sabrina, Selina, Alena, Veneranda, Timea and Patricia

Left voluntary: Nadja

Eliminated: None

=== Episode 08: Final ===
Airs on 10 October 2015

Strenuous vocal coaching, sweaty dance training, great emotion and compelling performances – that was the exciting way the POPSTARS candidates have gone over many weeks to make their dream of a pop-star life come true. The POPSTARS Academy is now the scene of the grand finale: Which girls will be able to say: "We are the new Popstars band!"?

In the show the Popstars Candidates must first present in different band constellations front of the audience and the critical eye of the jury. Soul-pop singer Stefanie Heinzmann, Urban Music Star Miss Platnum and choreographer and dancer Bella Garcia must now make her well heaviest judgment and make the final selection among the musically talented girl.

In addition, two great mysteries will be revealed in the finale: The crowd will hear for the first time the brand new single of POPSTARS band and learn the name of the formation.

Another highlight: Stefanie Heinzmann and Miss Platnum will perform their latest songs.

Round 1:

Shake It Off, performed by Sabrina, Selina, Alena, Patricia, Veneranda and Timea

Lieblingmensch, performed by Sabrina, Patricia and Veneranda

Earned It, performed by Selina, Alena and Timea

New band members: SABRINA and ALENA

Round 2:

Schöner Ohne Dich, performed by Timea, Veneranda, Selina and Patricia

Eliminated: Timea

New band member: SELINA

Band name announced: LEANDAH

Round 3:

Tage wie Juwelen, performed by Leandah feat. Veneranda

Tage wie Juwelen, performed by Leandah feat. Patricia

New band member: PATRICIA

Eliminated: Veneranda
