= Dayz Like That =

1999 single by Fierce

Single by Fierce

from the album Right Here Right Now
- B-side: "Keep Me from Falling"
- Released: 1999
- Length: 4:47
- Label: Wildstar; Hardback
- Songwriters: Karl Gordon; Michelle Escoffery; Ali Tennant
- Producer: Karl "K-Gee" Gordon

Fierce singles chronology
| "Right Here Right Now" (1999) | "Dayz Like That" (1999) | "So Long" (1999) |

Music video
- "Dayz Like That" on YouTube

"Dayz Like That" is a song by British girl group Fierce, written by K-Gee, Michelle Escoffery, and Ali Tennant. Produced by K-Gee, it was released as the second single from Fierce's debut album, Right Here Right Now, in 1999. It became the group's first top-20 hit on the UK Singles Chart, peaking at number 11 that May, and also reached at number two on the UK R&B Singles Chart the same week. In 2001, Canadian girl group Sugar Jones covered the song and released it as their debut single that May, reaching number one on the Canadian Singles Chart with their version.

== Track listings ==
UK CD1

1. "Dayz Like That" (K'Gee's extended mix)
2. "Keep Me from Falling"
3. "Dayz Like That" (Quake edit)

UK CD2

1. "Dayz Like That" (K-Gee's radio edit)
2. "Dayz Like That" (Blacksmith Bishop-Brad Olde Skool edit)
3. "Dayz Like That" (Phats & Small edit)
4. "Dayz Like That" (Full Crew remix featuring Tempa)

UK cassette single

1. "Dayz Like That" (K-Gee's radio edit)
2. "Dayz Like That" (Blacksmith Bishop-Brad Olde Skool edit)
3. "Dayz Like That" (Phats & Small edit)

== Personnel ==
Personnel are taken from the UK CD1 liner notes.

- K-Gee – writing (as Karl Gordon), production
- Michelle Escoffery – writing
- Ali Tennant – writing
- Andrew Smith – guitar
- Sean Cox – keyboards
- Marcellus Fernandes – recording, mixing

== Charts ==
| Chart (1999) | Peak position |
|---|---|
| Scotland Singles (OCC) | 41 |
| UK Singles (OCC) | 11 |
| UK Hip Hop/R&B (OCC) | 2 |

== Sugar Jones version ==
"Days Like That"

Single by Sugar Jones

from the album Sugar Jones
- Released: 1 May 2001
- Recorded: 2001
- Studio: Metalworks (Mississauga, Ontario)
- Length: 3:48
- Label: Lone Eagle Music
- Songwriters: Karl Gordon; Michelle Escoffery; Ali Tennant
- Producer: Justin Gray

Sugar Jones singles chronology
| "Days Like That" (2001) | "How Much Longer" (2001) |

Audio
- "Days Like That" on YouTube

=== Background ===
Popstars was a television programme originating from New Zealand that focused on creating a pop music group by auditioning thousands of contestants across the country at select venues. For the Canadian incarnation, the top 25 finalists travelled to Toronto, where they began training to become pop singers. Eventually, the programme's judges narrowed the finalists down to five women: Julie Crochetière, Mirella Dell'Aquila, Sahara MacDonald, Andrea Henry and Maiko Watson, who would become Sugar Jones. After their formation, they began working on their debut album, including "Dayz Like That", which was retitled "Days Like That".

=== Release and reception ===
"Days Like That" was serviced to Canadian radio on 6 April 2001 and entered the Canadian CHR chart at number 22, which at the time was the highest entry by a Canadian debut act. The commercial CD single was issued on 1 May 2001 by Lone Eagle Music, containing the song's radio mix and a refix by Baby Silver featuring Canadian rapper Solitair. Sugar Jones promoted the release by signing copies of the single at the Bramalea City Centre's Zellers store on the same day. On 9 May, the single debuted at number one on the Canadian Singles Chart, a position it held for six consecutive weeks. At the end of the year, it was ranked as Canada's most successful physical single of 2001. At the Juno Awards of 2002, the song's producer, Justin Gray, was nominated for Best Producer for his work on this song and the album track "I Got U", losing to Daniel Lanois, who produced U2's "Beautiful Day" and "Elevation".

=== Music video ===
A music video was filmed for "Days Like That". Codenamed "Project X", the video was shot on 24 and 25 March 2001. Directed by Noble Jones and produced by Mark Hesselink, the video shows Sugar Jones performing the song in a house. The video premiered on Popstars on 15 April 2001 and debuted on the Canadian music channel MuchMusic the following day; by the following week, it was named MuchMusic's "Big One".

=== Credits and personnel ===
Credits are taken from the Canadian CD single and Sugar Jones liner notes.

Studios

- Recorded and mixed at Metalworks Recording Studios (Mississauga, Ontario)
- Mastered at Sterling Sound (New York City)

Personnel

- K-Gee – writing (as Karl Gordon)
- Michelle Escoffery – writing
- Ali Tennant – writing
- Justin Abedin – guitar
- Sam Sims – bass
- Justin Gray – all other instruments, drum programming, vocal arrangements, production
- Sugar Jones – vocal arrangements
- Graham Brewer – recording, mixing
- Bob Guido – recording and mixing assistance
- Joel Kazmi – recording and mixing assistance
- Tom Coyne – mastering

=== Charts ===
==== Weekly charts ====
| Chart (2001) | Peak position |
|---|---|
| Canada (Nielsen SoundScan) | 1 |

==== Year-end charts ====
| Chart (2001) | Position |
|---|---|
| Canada (Nielsen SoundScan) | 1 |

| Chart (2002) | Position |
|---|---|
| Canada (Nielsen SoundScan) | 154 |
