= Popstars (Lollipop album) =

Studio album by Lollipop
- Released: June 1, 2001
- Recorded: 2001
- Genre: Pop teen pop
- Length: 39:51
- Label: WEA Records; Warner Music Italy

Lollipop chronology
Popstars (2001)	Together (2004)

Singles from Popstars
- 1. "Down Down Down" Released: March 30, 2001; 2. "Don’t Leave Me Now" Released: June 22, 2001; 3. "When The Rain" Released: November 30, 2001

Popstars is the first album by Italian girl group Lollipop, released on June 1, 2001 by WEA Records / Warner Music Italy. It peaked at #14 on the Italian album chart and produced three singles, including the Italian #1 single "Down Down Down", "Don't Leave Me Now" and "When The Rain".

== Track listing ==
#	Title	Length
1.	"Down Down Down"	3:18
2.	"Don't Leave Me Now"	2:59
3.	"When The Rain"	3:52
4.	"Turn Me Around"	3:58
5.	"This Is The Reason"	3:24
6.	"I Want You"	3:37
7.	"Love Me For One Night"	3:08
8.	"Weekend Lover"	3:46
9.	"Maniac"	4:16
10.	"I'm Ready This Time"	4:23
11.	"Everybody Come On (Wanna Be A Popstar)"	3:04

== Charts ==
Album

Chart (2001)	Peak position
Italian Albums (FIMI)	7

Singles

Information
Down Down Down
- Released: April 2001
- Chart positions: #1 (ITA)
Don't Leave Me Now
- Released: June 2001
- Chart positions: #9 (ITA)
When The Rain
- Released: November 2001
- Chart positions:
