= I'm Moving On (Scott Cain song) =

Single by Scott Cain

from the album Controlled Folly
- Released: 6 May 2002
- Recorded: Studio M & Tiger (Sydney, Australia)
- Genre: Pop
- Length: 3:34
- Label: WEA
- Songwriter: Gregg Alexander
- Producer: Michael Szumowski

Scott Cain singles chronology
"I'm Moving On" (2002)	"Crazy People Rock" (2002)

"I'm Moving On" is a song by Scott Cain, winner of the 2002 Australian Popstars series. The lyrics deal with the singer's decision to end a relationship in which he feels he is being emotionally abused. Backing vocals on the track are sung by Rai Thistlethwayte of Thirsty Merc.

== Background ==
The song was written by Gregg Alexander and is a classic example of his style; the piano chord sequence is central to a steady drumbeat, with a slightly distorted electric guitar lick running in the background, much like his New Radicals hit "You Get What You Give". Cain once commented, "I heard [Gregg] on the demo and I thought, 'this is a great song and he's got a great voice'...but I wasn't sure about some of the lyrics at first. They seemed a little corny. But now I think it's a fantastic pop song that's fun and got a great feel to it. It's a song that people are going to like to listen to and at this point in my career, that's the best thing that I could ever have hoped for."

== Release and promotion ==
"I'm Moving On" was released as a CD single on 6 May 2002. The B-sides are covers of "When I Need You" by Leo Sayer and "Superstition" by Stevie Wonder, the latter of which remixed by BNA. "I'm Moving On" debuted at number one in Australia and sold over 35,000 copies to receive a gold certification from the Australian Recording Industry Association (ARIA). A music video was made to promote the single. In the video, Cain rides a skateboard with a gathering of friends in an old warehouse.

== Charts ==
=== Weekly charts ===
Chart (2002)	Peak position
Australia (ARIA)	1

=== Year-end charts ===
Chart (2002)	Position
Australia (ARIA)	61

== Certifications ==
Region	Certification	Certified units/sales
Australia (ARIA)	Gold	35,000^{^}
^{^} Shipments figures based on certification alone.
