= Fierce =

British girl group

- Origin: London, England
- Genres: R&B; soul; pop
- Instrument: Vocals
- Years active: 1998–2000
- Label: Wildstar
- Past members: Chantel Alleyne; Aisha Peters; Sabrina Weathers

Fierce were a British three-piece, all girl R&B group. They were signed to Colin Lester and Ian McAndrew's Wildstar Records, and scored four hit singles on the UK Singles Chart in 1999 and 2000. The biggest of the hits, "Sweet Love 2K", is a cover of the Anita Baker song "Sweet Love".

== After Fierce ==
Chantel Alleyne appeared on Deal or No Deal in 2025 and won £1,050, enough money for a trip to Barbados. She is now an office manager for a tech company and is the office DJ; she also confirmed she has supported Whitney Houston.

== Discography ==
=== Albums ===
List of albums, with selected details and chart positions
| Title | Details | Peak chart positions | |
| Title | Details | UK | UK R&B |
|---|---|---|---|
| Right Here Right Now | Released: 16 August 1999; Label: Wildstar; Formats: CD, cassette | 27 | 8 |

=== Singles ===
List of singles, with selected chart positions
| Title | Year | Peak chart positions | | Album |
| Title | Year | UK | UK R&B | Album |
|---|---|---|---|---|
| "Right Here Right Now" | 1999 | 25 | — | Right Here Right Now |
| "Dayz Like That" | 1999 | 11 | 2 | Right Here Right Now |
| "So Long" | 1999 | 15 | 4 | Right Here Right Now |
| "Sweet Love 2K"^{1} | 2000 | 3 | 2 | Right Here Right Now |
"—" denotes a recording that did not chart or was not released in that territory.

==== Notes ====
- ^{1} The version of "Sweet Love" that features on Fierce's album Right Here Right Now was produced by Jeremy Wheatley and Magnus Fiennes. The single version was re-titled "Sweet Love 2K" and was produced by Stargate.
