= Leandah =

German Girls pop band

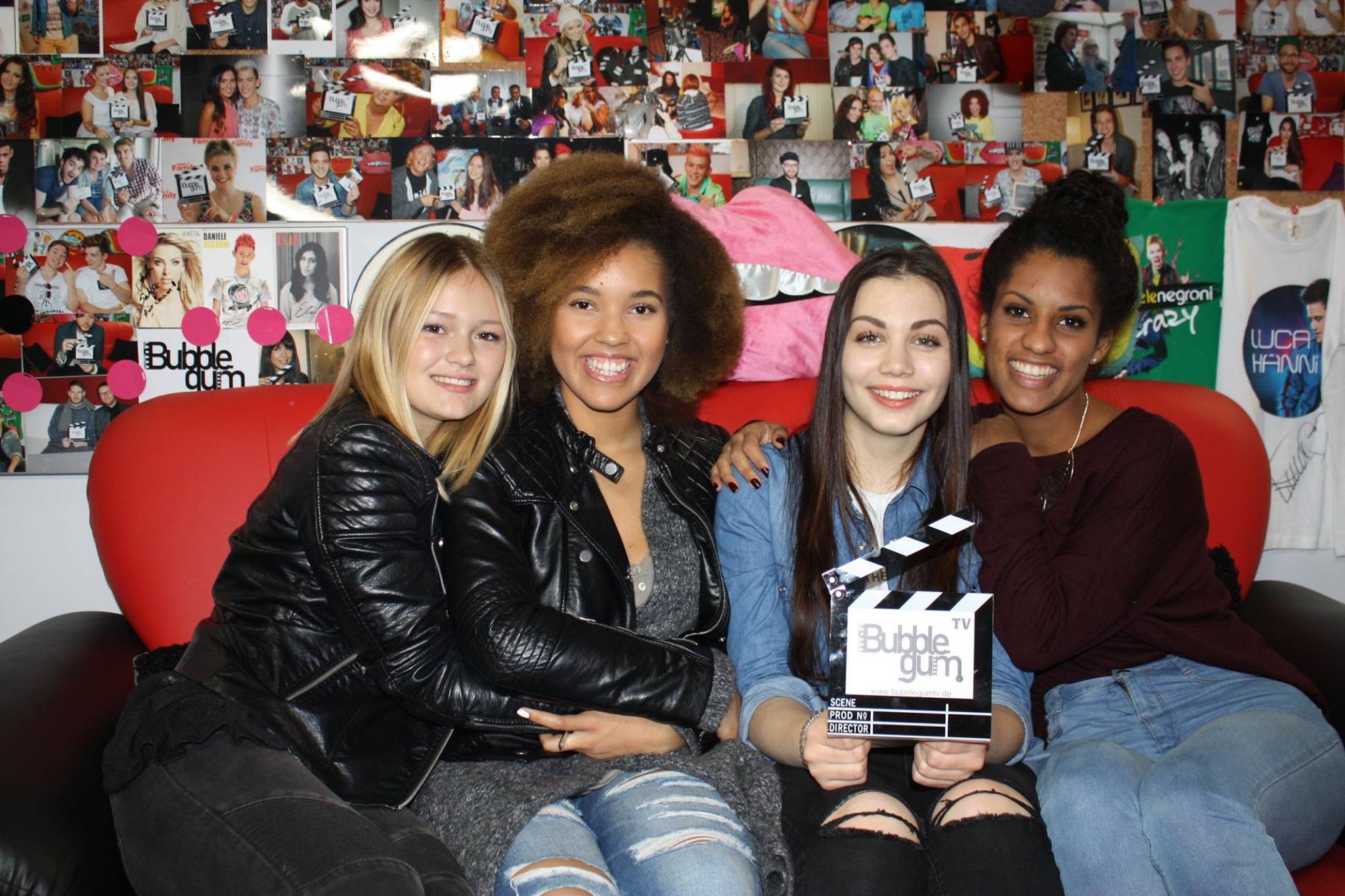

Background information
- Origin: Germany
- Genres: Pop
- Years active: 2015–2016
- Labels: Universal Music
- Members: Patricia Ekkert; Alena Fischer; Selina Frimpong-Ansah; Sabrina Kolip

Leandah was a German girl group, created on the eleventh installment of the television show Popstars in 2015. The group comprised singers Patricia Ekkert, Alena Fischer, Selina Frimpong-Ansah, and Sabrina Kolip. Their debut single, "Tage wie Juwelen", was released on 10 October 2015 to minor commercial success. The quartet announced their disbandment in February 2016.

== Discography ==
=== Singles ===
Year	Single	Chart positions		
Year	Single	GER	AUT	SWI
2015	"Tage wie Juwelen"			
2015	"Tage wie Juwelen"	—	—	—
