= Dominique Fidanza =

Belgian-Italian singer

- Born: Brussels, Belgium
- Genres: Pop, acoustic, folk
- Website: www.dominiquefidanza.fr

Dominique Fidanza (born 7 August 1979 in Brussels) is a Belgian-Italian singer.

== Biography ==
Fidanza won the Italian version of the reality television singing competition Popstars and was a member of Italian band Lollipop. In 2006, she moved to France to participate at the French reality television show Star Academy France and she arrived at the end of the show but she lost against Cyril Cinélu. The music video La Place du passager was directed by Jérémie Carboni.

== Discography ==
=== Singles ===
- "La Place du passager" (2010)
