= Sugar Jones =

Canadian girl group

- Origin: Toronto, Ontario, Canada
- Genres: Pop, R&B
- Years active: 2000–2003
- Labels: Lone Eagle Entertainment, Universal
- Members: Mirella Dell'Aquila; Julie Crochetière; Andrea Henry; Sahara MacDonald; Maiko Watson

Sugar Jones was a Canadian all-female pop group created on the first season of the Canadian version of Popstars in 2001. It consisted of five members chosen from thousands of contestants who auditioned all over Canada in hopes of gaining a spot in the group. In 2001, they released their debut and only album, which was self-titled, in the summer of 2001, that featured the singles "Days Like That" (a cover of the Fierce song) and "How Much Longer", both which were hits on Canadian radio in 2001. Sugar Jones studio album was recorded at Metalworks Studios in Mississauga, Ontario. After mostly local Canadian success, the group set their sights for the UK market. However, this venture saw little to no success, and Sugar Jones would ultimately disband in 2003.

== History ==
Sugar Jones was formed on the television show Popstars. The show had 4,000 entrees that was narrowed down to 75. After two call-backs, it was narrowed down to 25 members. The final winners were Maiko Watson, Sahara MacDonald, Andrea Henry, Julie Crochetière, and Mirella Dell'Aquila. The members of the group moved to Toronto in October 2000 to live in an apartment together, while the show only began airing in February 2001. The members had to hide and not be seen together to avoid spoiling the results of the program.

The group's debut single was "Days Like That", which peaked at No. 7 on Canada's Contemporary Hit Radio chart. Their second single, "How Much Longer", peaked at No. 5 on Canada's Airplay chart. Their debut album went platinum in Canada.

In 2002, Maiko Watson left Sugar Jones to sing backup for her then husband, musician Remy Shand, and the group continued as a foursome.

The group had disbanded by 2003.

== Discography ==
=== Studio albums ===
Title	Details	Peak chart positions	Certifications
Title	Details	CAN	Certifications
Sugar Jones	Release date: June 26, 2001; Label: Universal Music Group, Envy Music Ltd UK; Formats: CD	2	MC: Platinum
"—" denotes releases that did not chart

=== Singles ===
Year	Single	Peak chart positions	Album
Year	Single	CAN	Album
2001	"Days Like That"	1	Sugar Jones
2001	"How Much Longer"	5	Sugar Jones
"—" denotes releases that did not chart

=== Music videos ===
Year	Video	Director(s)
2001	"Days Like That"	Noble Jones
2001	"How Much Longer"	
