= Popstars =

International reality television franchise

- Created by: Jonathan Dowling; Bill Toepfer
- Original work: Popstars (New Zealand)
- Owner: Banijay Entertainment
- Years: 1999–2015, 2021–present

Popstars is an international reality television franchise aimed to find new singing talent. Serving as a precursor to the Idol franchise, Popstars first began in New Zealand in 1999 when producer Jonathan Dowling formed the girl group TrueBliss. Despite all shows in the Popstars franchise having been off air in recent years, it remains one of the most successful TV show formats of all time with the format being sold to more than 50 countries and producing groups such as Girls Aloud that had success on the UK charts for the next ten years after winning. The show was the inspiration for Simon Fuller's Idol franchise.

== History ==
International editions of Popstars

The series originated in New Zealand, broadcast on TV2 in 1999, where producer Jonathan Dowling formed the five member all-girl group TrueBliss. Dowling then licensed the concept to production company Screentime in Australia, who then on sold it to TresorTV in Germany before taking it worldwide. Despite all versions now being cancelled, Popstars remains very successful, with the format being sold to over 50 countries.

The show was the inspiration for Simon Fuller's Pop Idol franchise which would dominate reality TV, (along with Big Brother and Survivor) for the next few years.

Although Popstars started successfully in most countries during the early 2000s, the shows gradually began to fail and were dropped by many broadcasters due to poor ratings. The last country where Popstars was still popular and successful – besides other casting shows such as The X Factor and Got Talent, as well as Idol – was Germany. This is where ProSieben produced the ninth season in 2010 because of the show's massive success in the ratings, but in 2012, Popstars was finally cancelled due to the short success of the groups formed throughout the episodes. In 2007, the show returned to France on M6 for one season. A new version of Popstars started in 2008 in the Netherlands and ran for three seasons. Germany's version returned for an eleventh season in 2015, but would later get cancelled following poor ratings. In 2021, a revamped version of the original New Zealand series returned to TVNZ. The new series focuses on individual artists and songwriting development and does not involve putting together a pop group.

== Popstars around the world ==
Legend: Currently airing Franchise has ceased production Franchise awaiting debut or renewal

Country	Local title	Network	Host(s)	Judges	Seasons, series, winners, and groups formed	Other notable artists
Argentina	Popstars	Azul TV (1); Telefe (2 & 3)			Season 1, 2001: Bandana; Season 2, 2002: Mambrú; Season 3, 2026: Chapeaux	
Australia	Popstars	Seven Network			Season 1, 2000: Bardot; Season 2, 2001: Scandal'us; Season 3, 2002: Scott Cain	
Australia	Popstars Live	Seven Network			Season 1, 2004: Kayne Taylor	Miranda Murphy
Austria	Popstars: Mission Österreich	Puls 4 Website			Season 1, 2011: Kilmokit	Season 1, 2011: BFF
Belgium	Pop Stars	VT4			Season 1, 2001: Vanda Vanda	
Brazil	Popstars	SBT			Season 1, 2002: Rouge; Season 2, 2003: Br'oZ	Season 1: Kênia Boaventura, Janaína Lima, Maíra Charken, Marjorie Estiano and Quelynah; Season 2: Vinícius "D'Black" Cardoso
Canada	Popstars (1); Popstars: Boy Meets Girl (2); Popstars: The One (3)	CTV (1); Global TV (2–3)			Season 1, 2001: Sugar Jones; Season 2, 2002: Velvet Empire; Season 3, 2003: Christa Borden	Julie Crochetière
Colombia	Popstars	Canal Caracol			Season 1, 2002: Escarcha	
Denmark	Popstars (1–3, 5); Popstars Showtime! (4)	TV 2 (1–4); Kanal 5 (5)			Season 1, 2001: EyeQ; Season 2, 2002: Jon Nørgaard; Season 3, 2003: Fu:el; Season 4, 2004: Maria Lucia; Season 5, 2014: Linnea	Season 2: Julie Berthelsen and Christine Milton; Season 3: Emil Thorup
Ecuador	Popstars	Teleamazonas			Season 1, 2003: Kiruba; Season 2, 2004: La Coba	
Finland	Popstars	MTV3			Season 1, 2002: Gimmel, Paula Vesala, Mira Luoti; Season 2, 2004: INDX	Season 1: Jenni Vartiainen; Season 2: Jane
France	Popstars (1–2, 4–6); Popstars – le duel (3)	M6 (1–4); D8 (5); Amazon Prime Video (6)			Season 1, 2001: L5; Season 2, 2002: Whatfor; Season 3, 2003: Linkup; Season 4, 2007: Sheryfa Luna; Season 5, 2013: The Mess; Season 6, 2024: SOR4	Season 1: Louisy Joseph; Season 2: Chimène Badi; Season 3: Diadems and M. Pokora; Season 4: Léa Castel, Slimane; Season 5: Sindy Auvity
Germany	Popstars	RTL II (1–2, 11); ProSieben (3–10)			Season 1, 2000–01: No Angels; Season 2, 2001: Bro'Sis; Season 3, 2003: Overground; Season 4, 2004: Nu Pagadi; Season 5, 2006: Monrose; Season 6, 2007: Room 2012; Season 7, 2008: Queensberry; Season 8, 2009: Some & Any; Season 9, 2010: LaViVe; Season 10, 2012: Melouria; Season 11, 2015: Leandah	Season 2: Yasmin K. Season 3: Preluders; Season 5: Bisou
Greece	Popstars	Mega TV			Season 1, 2003: Hi-5	
Hungary	Popsztárok	TV2			Season 1, 2002: Sugar & Spice	
India	Coke [V] Popstars	Channel V			Season 1, 2002: Viva; Season 2, 2003: Aasma	
Indonesia	Popstars Indonesia	Trans TV			Season 1, 2003: Sparx	
Ireland	Irish Popstars	RTÉ One			Season 1, 2002: Six	Nadine Coyle
Italy	Popstar (1); Superstar Tour (2)	Italia 1			Season 1, 2001: Lollipop; Season 2, 2003: Lucky Star	Season 1: Valentina Monetta
Kenya	Coca-Cola Popstars					Season 1, 2004: Sema (Kenya)
Malaysia	Popstars	ntv7			Season 1, 2003: By'U	
Mexico	Popstars	Televisa			Season 1, 2002: T' de Tila	María León (Playa Limbo); Ana Brenda Contreras
Netherlands	Popstars: The Rivals	RTL 4			Season 1, 2004: Men2B (boys), Raffish (girls)	
Netherlands	Popstars	SBS6			Season 1, 2008: RED! Season 2, 2009–10: Wesley Klein; Season 3, 2010–11: Dean Saunders	
New Zealand	Popstars	TVNZ 2			Season 1, 1999: TrueBliss; Season 2, 2021: Christabel Williams; Season 3, TBA: Renewal pending	
Norway	Popstars	TV3			Season 1, 2001: Cape	
Portugal	Popstars	SIC			Season 1, 2001: Nonstop	Gémeas
Romania	Popstars România	Pro TV			Season 1, 2003: Cocktail	Bliss
Russia	Стань звездой (Stan zvezdoy)	Telekanal Rossiya			Season 1, 2002: Drugie Pravila (Другие правила; lit. Other rules)	
Slovakia	Coca-Cola Popstar	Markíza			Season 1, 2001: Seven Days to Winter; Season 2, 2002: Misha; Season 3, 2003: Zuzana Smatanová; Season 4, 2004: Vetroplach; Season 5, 2005: Bystrík; Season 6, 2006: Ivo Bič; Season 7, 2007: Peoples; Season 8, 2008: Mária Čírová	
Slovenia	Popstars	Kanal A			Season 1, 2002: Bepop; Season 2, 2003: Unique	Season 2: B.B.T. and Hajdi Korošec
South Africa	Popstars	SABC 3 (1); SABC 1 (2-3) e.tv (4)			Season 1, 2002: 101; Season 2, 2003: Adilah; Season 3 2004: Jamali and Ghetto Lingo; Season 4, 2010: Nne Vida	Season 1: Afro Z
Spain	Popstars: Todo por un sueño	Telecinco			Season 1, 2002: Bellepop	Jesús Vázquez
Sweden	Popstars	Kanal 5			Season 1, 2001: Excellence; Season 2, 2002: Supernatural; Season 3, 2003: Johannes Kotschy	Season 2: Martin Rolinski
Switzerland	Popstars	TV3			Season 1, 2001: Tears	
Tanzania	Coca-Cola Popstars				Season 1, 2004: Wakilisha	
Turkey	Popstars	Kanal D (1); Show TV (2); Star TV (3)			Season 1, 2003: Adibin Özşahin; Season 2, 2004: Selçuk Demirelli; Season 3, 2006: Metin Levent	
Uganda	Coca-Cola Popstars				Season 1, 2004: Blu3	
Ukraine	Суперзірка (Superstar)	1+1			Season 1, 2010: Viktoriya Korzheniuk	
United Kingdom	Popstars (1); Popstars: The Rivals (2)	ITV			Season 1, 2001: Hear'Say; Season 2, 2002: Girls Aloud	Season 1: Liberty X (finalists), Darius Danesh, Warren Stacey; Season 2: One True Voice, Javine Hylton, Clea, Phixx, The Cheeky Girls, Hazel Kaneswaran
United States	Popstars USA	The WB			Season 1, Early 2001: Eden's Crush; Season 2, Late 2001: Scene 23	Season 1: Nicole Scherzinger, Nikki McKibbin; Season 2: Josh Henderson

== Number one singles ==
The following is a list of singles that reached No. 1 in the respective nations of the Popstars artists

Artist	Nation	Song title	Date	Album
Bandana	Argentina	"Guapas"	December 2001	Bandana
Bandana	Argentina	"Cómo Puede Ser"	February 2002	Bandana
Bandana	Argentina	"Maldita Noche"	May 2002	Bandana
Bandana	Argentina	"Llega la Noche"	August 2002	Noche
Bandana	Argentina	"Sigo Dando Vueltas"	April 2003	Vivir Intentando
Mambrú	Argentina	"A Veces"	November 2002	Mambrú
Scandal'us	Australia	"Me, Myself & I"	April 2001	Startin' Somethin'
Bardot	Australia	"Poison"	April 2000	Bardot
Scott Cain	Australia	"I'm Moving On"	May 2002	Controlled Folly
Rouge	Brazil	"Não Dá Pra Resistir"	July 2002	Rouge
Rouge	Brazil	"Ragatanga (The Ketchup Song)"	October 2002	Rouge
Rouge	Brazil	"Brilha La Luna"	April 2003	C'est La Vie
Rouge	Brazil	"Um Anjo Veio Me Falar"	October 2003	C'est La Vie
Br'oZ	Brazil	"Prometida"	August 2003	Br'oZ
Sugar Jones	Canada	"Days Like That"	June 2001	Sugar Jones
Fu:el	Denmark	"Please Please"	May 2003	Next, Please
Kiruba	Ecuador	"Quisiera"	April 2003	Kiruba
Kiruba	Ecuador	"Camina"	June 2003	Kiruba
Kiruba	Ecuador	"Como Extraño Tu Luz"	August 2003	Kiruba
Kiruba	Ecuador	"Me Pierdo"	November 2003	Kiruba
Kiruba	Ecuador	"Me Quedo Contigo"	May 2004	Baila La Luna
L5	France	"Toutes les femmes de ta vie"	December 2001	L5
Whatfor	France	"Plus haut"	November 2002	Whatfor
Linkup	France	"Mon étoile"	November 2003	Notre étoile
Sheryfa Luna	France	"Quelque part"	October 2007	Sheryfa Luna
Sheryfa Luna	France	"Il avait les mots"	January 2008	Sheryfa Luna
No Angels	Germany	"Daylight in Your Eyes"	February 2001	Elle'Ments
No Angels	Germany	"There Must Be an Angel"	August 2001	Elle'Ments
No Angels	Germany	"Something About Us"	May 2002	Now... Us!
No Angels	Germany	"No Angel (It's All in Your Mind)"	April 2003	Pure
Bro'Sis	Germany	"I Believe"	December 2001	Never Forget (Where You Come From)
Overground	Germany	"Schick mir 'nen Engel"	November 2003	It's Done
Preluders	Germany	"Everyday Girl"	November 2003	Girls in the House
Nu Pagadi	Germany	"Sweetest Poison"	December 2004	Your Dark Side
Monrose	Germany	"Shame"	December 2006	Temptation
Monrose	Germany	"Hot Summer"	July 2007	Strictly Physical
Six	Ireland	"There's a Whole Lot of Loving Going On"	February 2002	This Is It
Lollipop	Italy	"Down Down Down"	April 2001	Popstars
Nonstop	Portugal	"Ao Limite Eu Vou"	July 2001	Nonstop
Men2B	Netherlands	"Bigger than That"	December 2004	A Different Way
Raffish	Netherlands	"Plaything"	December 2004	How Raffish Are You?
TrueBliss	New Zealand	"Tonight"	May 1999	Dream
Hear'Say	United Kingdom	"Pure and Simple"	March 2001	Popstars
Hear'Say	United Kingdom	"The Way to Your Love"	June 2001	Popstars
Girls Aloud	United Kingdom	"Sound of the Underground"	December 2002	Sound of the Underground
Girls Aloud	United Kingdom	"I'll Stand by You"	November 2004	What Will the Neighbours Say?
Girls Aloud	United Kingdom	"Walk This Way" (with Sugababes)	March 2007	Stand-alone single for Comic Relief
Girls Aloud	United Kingdom	"The Promise"	October 2008	Out of Control
