= Johannes Kotschy =

Swedish singer and songwriter

Johannes Kotschy is a Swedish singer and songwriter who rose to fame after winning the third season of the Swedish reality show Popstars on Kanal5. An early favorite, he won the show convincingly.

Johannes has had several hit singles and presented awards at the NRJ Awards in Stockholm in 2004.
