= Bro'Sis discography =

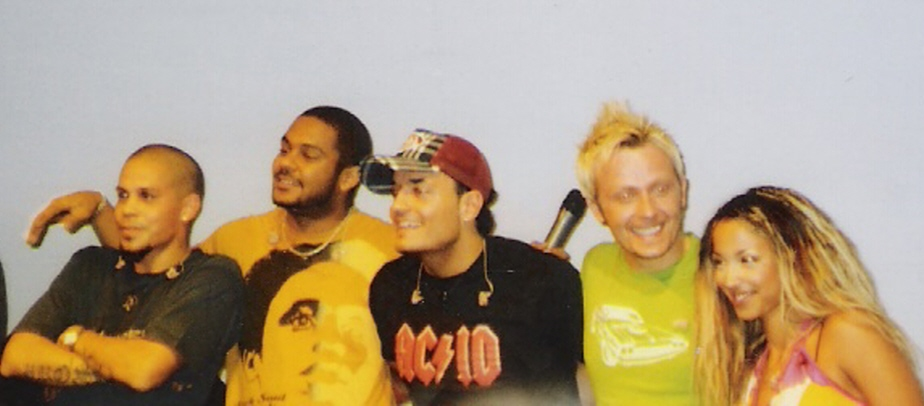
- Left to right: Shaham Joyce, Faiz Mangat, Giovanni Zarrella, Ross Antony, and Hila Bronstein in 2004.
- Studio albums: 3
- Singles: 10
- Video albums: 1

German pop group Bro'Sis, consisting of Ross Antony, Hila Bronstein, Shaham Joyce, Faiz Mangat, Indira Weis, Giovanni Zarrella, has released three studio albums, one video album and ten singles. Formed in late 2001 on Popstars – Du bist mein Traum, the second season of the German adaptation of the television talent show Popstars, the band released their debut single "I Believe" in December 2001. Selling a record-breaking 800,000 copies in its first week, it debuted atop the singles charts in Austria, Germany, and Switzerland. Parent album Never Forget (Where You Come From), released in January 2002, debuted at number one on both the Austrian and German Albums Chart and was eventually certified 2× Platinum by the Bundesverband Musikindustrie (BVMI) for shipments figures of over 600,000 copies. It also reached Gold status in Austria and Switzerland and produced three further top ten hits, including "Do You", "Heaven Must Be Missing an Angel" and reissue single "Hot Temptation."

In May 2003, only a few days before the release of the group's second studio album Days of Our Lives, Weiss announced her departure from the band. With the five remaining members continuing as a quintet, the album debuted and peaked at number ten on the German Albums Chart. Its first single, double A-side "Oh No"/"Never Stop," became another top ten hit in Germany, while follow-up "V.I.P." peaked at number 19 on the German Singles Chart. Bro'Sis' third and final album, Showtime was released in August 2004. Commercially less successful, it failed to chart in Austria and Switzerland but peaked at number 24 on the German Albums Chart. The album produced two singles, including "U Build Me Up," which marked the band's eighth consecutive top 20 hit in Germany. In 2005, the band announced a minor hiatus that was later revealed to be an official break-up.

== Albums ==
=== Studio album ===
List of albums, with selected chart positions and certifications
Title	Album details	Peak chart positions			Certifications
Title	Album details	GER	AUT	SWI	Certifications
Never Forget (Where You Come From)	Released: 21 January 2002; Label: Cheyenne, Polydor, Zeitgeist; Formats: CD, digital download	1	1	6	BVMI: 2× Platinum; IFPI AUT: Gold; IFPI SWI: Gold
Days of Our Lives	Released: 13 May 2003; Label: Cheyenne, Polydor, Zeitgeist; Formats: CD, digital download	10	37	39	
Showtime	Released: 30 August 2004; Label: Cheyenne, Polydor, Zeitgeist; Formats: CD, digital download	24	—	—	

== Singles ==
List of singles, with selected chart positions and parent album
Title	Year	Peak positions			Certifications	Album
Title	Year	GER	AUT	SWI	Certifications	Album
"I Believe"	2001	1	1	1	BVMI: 3× Platinum; IFPI AUT: Platinum; IFPI SWI: Platinum	Never Forget (Where You Come From)
"Do You"	2002	3	5	19		Never Forget (Where You Come From)
"Heaven Must Be Missing an Angel"	2002	9	29	35		Never Forget (Where You Come From)
"Hot Temptation"	2002	4	11	46		Never Forget (Where You Come From)
"The Gift"	2002	16	40	—		Never Forget (Where You Come From)
"Oh No"/"Never Stop"	2003	7	24	66		Days of Our Lives
"V.I.P."	2003	19	—	—		Days of Our Lives
"U Build Me Up"	2004	20	51	—		Showtime
"Make Up Your Mind"	2004	—	—	—		Showtime
"—" denotes a recording that did not chart or was not released in that territory.

=== As featured artists ===
List of singles as featured artist, with selected chart positions and parent album
Title	Year	Peak positions			Certifications	Album
Title	Year	GER	AUT	SWI	Certifications	Album
"Do They Know It's Christmas?" (with TV All Stars)	2003	3	28	32	BVMI: Gold	Ultimate Christmas Album

== Other appearances ==
List of album appearances
Title	Year	Album
"White Christmas"	2003	The Ultimate Christmas Album
"With a Little Help from My Friends"	2004	Red Nose Day 04
"Theme from Shin Chan"	2004	RTL II Anime Hits 3
"Get It On"	2004	The History of Popstars

== Music videos ==
List of music videos
Title	Year	Director(s)
"I Believe"	2001	Patric Ullaeus
"Do You"	2002	Daniel Lwowski
"Heaven Must Be Missing an Angel"	2002	Joern Heitmann
"Hot Temptation"	2002	Katja Kuhl
"The Gift"	2002	Unknown
"Oh No"	2003	Katja Kuhl
"Never Stop"	2003	Hinrich Pflug
"V.I.P."	2003	Katja Kuhl
"Do They Know It's Christmas?"	2003	Johannes Grebert
"U Build Me Up"	2004	Katja Kuhl
"Make Up Your Mind"	2004	Katja Kuhl
