= Darja Schabad =

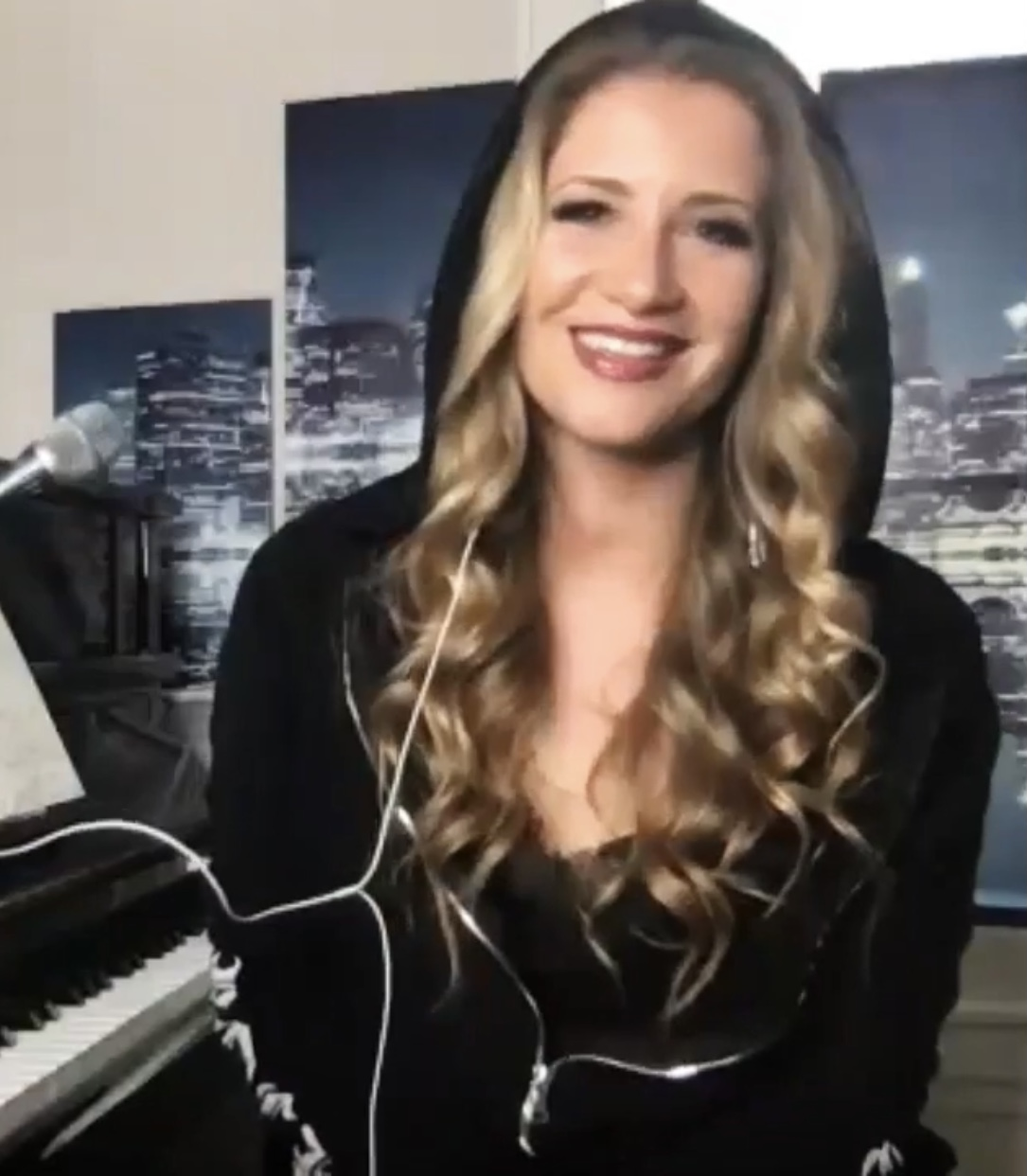
- Schabad in 2020

Background information
- Origin: Riga, Latvia
- Genres: Pop, EDM
- Occupation(s): Singer, actress
- Years active: 2000–present
- Website: darjasmusic.com

Darja Schabad (Russian: Дарья Шабад; born 6 January 1983) is a vocalist and actress originally from Riga, Latvia.

== Early life and education ==
Darja Schabad (pronounced "Daria") grew up in Bremen, Germany before moving to London, England, where she studied at Bradfield College to complete her A-Level studies. She speaks four languages fluently due to her international upbringing – Russian, German, English and Spanish.

== Career ==
Schabad deferred her university education to participate in the popular German reality TV show Popstars in 2001. More than 11,000 singers attended open television auditions in Frankfurt, Cologne, Berlin, Stuttgart, Hamburg and Munich, conducted by choreographer Detlef "D!" Soost, producer Alex Christensen and singer and radio host Noah Sow. After auditioning in Frankfurt and after multiple "recalls", Schabad was chosen as one of 32 contestants who immediately travelled to Ibiza, Spain, to get trained in singing, dancing and fitness. In the end, three females, including Schabad, and five males remained who again moved into a loft in Munich to start working on their performance and publicity skills. During a special episode on 11 November 2001, judges Soost and Christensen eventually disclosed that Ross Antony, Hila Bronstein, Shaham Joyce, Faiz Mangat, Indira Weis and Giovanni Zarrella were chosen to become part of the multicultural group Bro'Sis. Schabad was voted out in that episode.

During Popstars, Schabad gained significant publicity in Germany and started working on a solo career with producer Tony Coutura. She rejected a solo record deal offer by East West Records to pursue a BSc in international relations at the London School of Economics. While still at university, in 2003, Schabad participated in the second season of ITV's Pop Idol, where she was selected into the last 5 groups of 10 in the competition. After her performance of Shakira's "Underneath Your Clothes", Simon Cowell stated that Schabad has "The X Factor".

After graduating in 2005, Schabad transferred to New York City in 2007 to pursue an acting degree at the American Academy of Dramatic Arts. Since her graduation, she has appeared in films, commercials, industrials and voiceovers, representing companies such as Perkinelmer, Canon, UBS Investment Bank and PUMA, where she is the voice of the PUMA Perfume Animagical global commercial campaign, featuring Usain Bolt.

Schabad is currently working as a host and executive producer for CorporateProfile.com. She is still active as a singer and is currently working on her EDM album release. Most recently, she has performed at The Montauk Music Festival.
