= I Believe (Bro'Sis song) =

2001 single by Bro'Sis

Single by Bro'Sis

from the album Never Forget (Where You Come From)
- Released: 3 December 2001
- Recorded: 2001
- Length: 3:27
- Label: Cheyenne; Polydor; Zeitgeist
- Songwriters: Alex Christensen; Jens Klein; Peter Könemann; Clyde "J. Ena" "Ward
- Producer: Alex Christensen

Bro'Sis singles chronology
"I Believe" (2001)	"Do You" (2002)

"I Believe" is a song by German pop group Bro'Sis. It was written by Alex Christensen, Jens Klein, Peter Könemann, and Clyde "J. Ena" "Ward and produced by the former for their debut studio album, Never Forget (Where You Come From) (2001). The song was released as the band's debut single on 3 December 2001 following their formation on the RTL II reality television show Popstars – Du bist mein Traum. It became the year's Christmas number one in Germany and spent five consecutive weeks at number one, achieving a double platinum certification from the Bundesverband Musikindustrie (BVMI).

== Chart performance ==
Selling a record-breaking 800,000 copies in its first week of release, "I Believe" debuted on top the singles charts in Austria, Germany, and Switzerland. Germany's Christmas number one of 2001, it spent five consecutive weeks at number one. The song was certified double platinum by the BVMI for shipments figures of more than one million physical units.

== Music video ==
A music video for "I Believe" was directed by Swedish film maker Patric Ullaeus and filmed in Gothenburg in November 2001. Detlef Soost served as the video's choreographer.

== Track listing ==
Maxi single
No.	Title	Length
1.	"I Believe" (video/radio mix)	3:27
2.	"I Believe" (smooth radio mix)	3:27
3.	"I Believe" (maxi version)	4:30
4.	"I Believe" (instrumental version)	3:27

== Credits and personnel ==
- Ross Antony – vocals
- Hila Bronstein – vocals
- Alex Christensen – writing, production, scratches
- Jens Klein – keyboards, programming, editing, mixing
- Peter Könemann – keyboards, programming, editing
- Shaham Joyce – vocals
- Faiz Mangat – vocals
- Indira Weis – vocals
- Giovanni Zarrella – vocals

== Charts ==
=== Weekly charts ===
Weekly chart performance for "I Believe"
Chart (2001–2002)	Peak position
Austria (Ö3 Austria Top 40)	1
Europe (Eurochart Hot 100)	4
Germany (GfK)	1
Switzerland (Schweizer Hitparade)	1

=== Year-end charts ===
2001 year-end chart performance for "I Believe"
Chart (2001)	Position
Germany (Media Control)	77

2002 year-end chart performance for "I Believe"
Chart (2002)	Position
Austria (Ö3 Austria Top 40)	4
Europe (Eurochart Hot 100)	45
Germany (Media Control)	12
Switzerland (Schweizer Hitparade)	15

=== Decade-end charts ===
Decade-end chart performance for "I Believe"
Chart (2000–2010)	Position
Germany (Media Control GfK)	11

== Certifications ==
Certifications for "I Believe"
Region	Certification	Certified units/sales
Austria (IFPI Austria)	Platinum	40,000^{*}
Germany (BVMI)	2× Platinum	1,140,000
Switzerland (IFPI Switzerland)	Platinum	40,000^{^}
^{*} Sales figures based on certification alone.^{^} Shipments figures based on certification alone.
