= This Gift (song) =

1999 single by 98°

Single by 98 Degrees

from the album This Christmas
- Released: November 15, 1999
- Length: 4:08
- Label: Universal
- Songwriters: Anders Bagge; Arnthor Birgisson; Dane Deviller; Sean Hosein

98 Degrees singles chronology
"I Do (Cherish You)" (1999)	"This Gift" (1999)	"Thank God I Found You" (2000)

Live video
- "This Gift" on YouTube

"This Gift" is a song performed by American boy band 98 Degrees, issued as the only single from their third studio album, This Christmas. The song was written by Anders Bagge, Arnthor Birgisson, Dane Deviller, and Sean Hosein; and it peaked at number 49 on the US Billboard Hot 100 and number 14 on the Billboard Adult Contemporary chart.

== Charts ==
Weekly chart performance for "This Gift"
Chart (2000)	Peak position
Canada Top Singles (RPM)	25
US Billboard Hot 100	49
US Adult Contemporary (Billboard)	14
US Pop Airplay (Billboard)	20
US Rhythmic Airplay (Billboard)	25

== Bro'Sis version ==
"The Gift"

Single by Bro'Sis

from the album Never Forget (Where You Come From)
- Released: December 9, 2002
- Length: 4:07
- Label: Cheyenne; Polydor; Zeitgeist
- Songwriters: Anders Bagge; Arnthor Birgisson; Dane Deviller; Sean Hosein
- Producer: Peter Ries

Bro'Sis singles chronology
"Hot Temptation" (2002)	"The Gift" (2002)	"Oh No" / "Never Stop" (2003)

Music video
- "The Gift" on YouTube

In 2002, German pop group Bro'Sis re-recorded the song for the Special Winter Edition reissue of their debut studio album Never Forget (Where You Come From) (2002). Re-titled "The Gift" and released as reissue's second single, it entered the top 20 of the German Singles Chart.

=== Track listings ===
Maxi single
No.	Title	Length
1.	"The Gift" (radio edit)	3:47
2.	"The Gift" (X-Mas radio edit)	4:08
3.	"The Gift" (acoustic mix)	4:08
4.	"The Gift" (X-Mas acoustic mix)	3:20
5.	"The Gift" (album version)	4:07

=== Personnel ===
- Ross Antony – vocals
- Hila Bronstein – vocals
- Nik Hafeman – vocal arrangements, executive production
- Shaham Joyce – vocals
- Dirk Kurock – vocals recording
- Faiz Mangat – vocals
- Peter Ries – production, mixing
- Ossi Schaller – guitars
- Indira Weis – vocals
- Giovanni Zarrella – vocals

=== Charts ===
Weekly chart performance for "This Gift"
Chart (2002)	Peak position
Austria (Ö3 Austria Top 40)	40
Germany (GfK)	16
