= Heaven Must Be Missing an Angel (Bro'Sis song) =

Single by Bro'Sis

from the album Never Forget (Where You Come From)
- Released: 3 June 2002
- Length: 3:48
- Label: Cheyenne; Polydor; Zeitgeist
- Songwriters: Dane Deviller; Sean Hossein; René Tromborg; Rasmus Bille Bahncke
- Producers: D-Fact; Frank Lio; N-Dee

Bro'Sis singles chronology
"Do You" (2002)	"Heaven Must Be Missing an Angel" (2002)	"Hot Temptation" (2002)

"Heaven Must Be Missing an Angel" is a song by German pop group Bro'Sis. It was written by Dane Deviller, Sean Hossein, and René Tromborg and Rasmus Bille Bahncke from songwriting team Supaflyas for the band's debut studio album Never Forget (Where You Come From) (2002), while production was helmed by D-Fact, Frank Lio, N-Deefor under their production moniker Syndicate. The song was released as the album's third single and became the band's third consecutive top ten hit in Germany.

== Music video ==
A music video for "Heaven Must Be Missing an Angel" was directed by Joern Heitmann

== Track listings ==
CD single
No.	Title	Writer(s)	Producer(s)	Length
1.	"Heaven Must Be Missing an Angel" (radio version)	Dane Deviller; Sean Hossein; René Tromborg; Rasmus Bille Bahncke	D-Fact; Frank Lio; N-Dee	3:51
2.	"This Is Too Good to Be True"	David Michael Johnson; Bernie Blanks; Ross Antony; Hila Bronstein; Shaham Joyce; Faiz Mangat; Indira Weis; Giovanni Zarrella	Marc Mozart; John Eaton; Bro'Sis^{[a]}	3:32

Maxi single
No.	Title	Writer(s)	Producer(s)	Length
1.	"Heaven Must Be Missing an Angel" (radio version)	Deviller; Hossein; Tromborg; Bahncke	D-Fact; Lio; N-Dee	3:51
2.	"Heaven Must Be Missing an Angel" (extended mix)	Deviller; Hossein; Tromborg; Bahncke	D-Fact; Lio; N-Dee	5:06
3.	"Heaven Must Be Missing an Angel" (groove club mix)	Deviller; Hossein; Tromborg; Bahncke	D-Fact; Lio; N-Dee	5:32
4.	"Heaven Must Be Missing an Angel" (unplugged mix)	Deviller; Hossein; Tromborg; Bahncke	D-Fact; Lio; N-Dee	3:46
5.	"This Is Too Good to Be True"	Johnson; Blanks; Antony; Bronstein; Joyce; Mangat; Weis; Zarrella	Mozart; Eaton; Bro'Sis^{[a]}	3:32

Notes

- ^{^a} signifies co-producer(s)

== Credits and personnel ==
- Ross Antony – vocals
- Hila Bronstein – vocals
- Shaham Joyce – vocals
- Achim "Frank Lio" Kleist – production
- Andy "N-Dee" Lutschounig – production
- Faiz Mangat – vocals
- Wolfgang "D-Fact" Webenau – production
- Indira Weis – vocals
- Giovanni Zarrella – vocals

== Charts ==
Weekly chart performance for "Heaven Must Be Missing an Angel"
Chart (2002)	Peak position
Austria (Ö3 Austria Top 40)	29
Germany (GfK)	9
Switzerland (Schweizer Hitparade)	35
