= Do You (Bro'Sis song) =

Single by Bro'Sis

from the album Never Forget (Where You Come From)
- Released: 25 February 2002
- Length: 3:09
- Label: Cheyenne; Polydor; Zeitgeist
- Songwriter(s): Toni Cottura; Patricia Bernetti; Arkadius Raschka; Ingo Hugenroth
- Producer(s): Toni Cottura

Bro'Sis singles chronology
| "I Believe" (2001) | "Do You" (2002) | "Heaven Must Be Missing an Angel" (2002) |

"Do You" is a song by German pop group Bro'Sis. It was written by Toni Cottura, Patricia Bernetti, Arkadius Raschka, and Ingo Hugenroth and produced by the former for their debut studio album Never Forget (Where You Come From) (2002). The uptempo song was released by Cheyenne Records as the album's second single on 25 February 2002 and became a top five hit in Austria and Germany.

== Music video ==
A music video for "Do You" was directed by Daniel Lwowski.

== Track listings ==
CD single
| No. | Title | Writer(s) | Producer(s) | Length |
|---|---|---|---|---|
| 1. | "Do You" (radio version) | Toni Cottura; Patricia Bernetti; Arkadius Raschka; Ingo Hugenroth | Cottura | 3:01 |
| 2. | "Peace of Soul" | Marc Mozart; Ross Antony; Hila Bronstein; Shaham Joyce; Faiz Mangat; Indira Weis; Giovanni Zarrella | Mozart; Bro'Sis^{[a]} | 3:37 |

Enhanced maxi single
| No. | Title | Writer(s) | Producer(s) | Length |
|---|---|---|---|---|
| 1. | "Do You" (radio version) | Cottura; Bernetti; Raschka; Hugenroth | Cottura | 3:01 |
| 2. | "Do You" (acoustic version) | Cottura; Bernetti; Raschka; Hugenroth | Cottura | 3:16 |
| 3. | "Do You" (C-B-M Remix) | Cottura; Bernetti; Raschka; Hugenroth | Cottura; C-B-M Productions^{[b]} | 3:59 |
| 4. | "Peace of Soul" (radio version) | Mozart; Antony; Bronstein; Joyce; Mangat; Weis; Zarrella | Mozart; Bro'Sis^{[a]} | 3:37 |
| 5. | "Peace of Soul" (original version) | Mozart; Antony; Bronstein; Joyce; Mangat; Weis; Zarrella | Mozart; Bro'Sis^{[a]} | 4:46 |
| 6. | "Do You" (music video) | | | 3:01 |

Notes

- ^{^a} signifies co-producer(s)
- ^{^b} signifies additional producer(s)

== Credits and personnel ==
- Ross Antony – vocals
- Hila Bronstein – vocals
- Toni Cottura – production
- Shaham Joyce – vocals
- Faiz Mangat – vocals
- Andi Regler – mixing
- Indira Weis – vocals
- Giovanni Zarrella – vocals

== Charts ==
=== Weekly charts ===
Weekly chart performance for "Do You"
| Chart (2002) | Peak position |
|---|---|
| Austria (Ö3 Austria Top 40) | 5 |
| Germany (GfK) | 3 |
| Switzerland (Schweizer Hitparade) | 19 |

=== Year-end charts ===
Year-end chart performance for "Do You"
| Chart (2002) | Position |
|---|---|
| Germany (Media Control) | 33 |
