= Never Stop (Bro'Sis song) =

2003 single by Bro'Sis

Single by Bro'Sis

from the album Days of Our Lives
- A-side: "Oh No"
- Released: 7 April 2003
- Length: 3:13
- Label: Cheyenne; Polydor; Zeitgeist
- Songwriter(s): Jens Klein; Anders Herrlin; Jennie Löfgren
- Producer(s): Thorsten Brötzmann

Bro'Sis singles chronology
"The Gift" (2002)	"Oh No" / "Never Stop" (2003)	"V.I.P." (2003)

"Never Stop" is a song by German pop group Bro'Sis. It was written by Jens Klein, Anders Herrlin, and Jennie Löfgren and produced by Thorsten Brötzmann for the band's second studio album Days of Our Lives (2003). Released as the album's lead single on 7 April 2003 on double A-side with Oh No", the pop rock-ballad became the group's sixth and final top ten entry on the German Singles Chart, peaking at number seven. It also marked the band's final release with Indira Weis who would announce her departure from Bro'Sis the following month.

== Music video ==
A music video for "Never Stop" was directed by Hinrich Pflug.

== Track listing ==
Maxi single
No.	Title	Writer(s)	Producer(s)	Length
1.	"Oh No" (radio edit)	Marc Mozart; Andy Love	Mozart; John Eaton	3:30
2.	"Oh No" (extended version)	Mozart; Love	Mozart; Eaton	4:10
3.	"Oh No" (D'Klay's urban rmx 2003)	Mozart; Love	Mozart; Eaton; Don Curry^{[a]}	3:59
4.	"Oh No" (The Futurehit Hell's Kitchen remix)	Mozart; Love	Mozart; Eaton; Futurehit^{[a]}	4:07
5.	"Never Stop"	Jens Klein; Anders Herrlin; Jennie Löfgren	Thorsten Brötzmann	3:13

== Credits and personnel ==
- Ross Antony – vocals
- Hila Bronstein – vocals
- Thorsten Brötzmann – production, keyboards
- Nik Hafeman – supervising producer
- Benjamin Hüllenkremer – bass guitars
- Shaham Joyce – vocals
- Christoph Leis-Bendorff – mixing, keyboards
- Faiz Mangat – vocals
- Peter Weihe – guitars
- Indira Weis – vocals
- Giovanni Zarrella – vocals

== Charts ==
=== Weekly charts ===
Weekly chart performance for "Oh No" / "Never Stop"
Chart (2003)	Peak position
Austria (Ö3 Austria Top 40)	24
Germany (GfK)	7
Switzerland (Schweizer Hitparade)	66

=== Year-end charts ===
Year-end chart performance for "Oh No" / "Never Stop"
Chart (2003)	Position
Germany (Media Control GfK)	100
