= V.I.P. (Bro'Sis song) =

"V.I.P"

Single by Bro'Sis

from the album Days of Our Lives
- Released: 16 June 2003
- Length: 4:10
- Label: Cheyenne; Polydor; Zeitgeist
- Songwriter(s): Pete Kirtley; Tim Hawes; Q; Darius Rustrum; Shaham Joyce; Faiz Mangat
- Producer(s): Peter Ries

Bro'Sis singles chronology
"Oh No" / "Never Stop" (2003)	"V.I.P" (2003)	"U Build Me Up" (2004)

"V.I.P." is a song by German pop group Bro'Sis. It was written by Pete Kirtley, Tim Hawes, Q, and Darius Rustrum, with additional writing by band members Shaham Joyce and Faiz Mangat, for the band's second studio album Days of Our Lives (2003). Produced by Peter Ries, it was released by Cheyenne Records as the album's second and final single and peaked at number 19 on the German Singles Chart.

== Music video ==
A music video for "V.I.P." was directed by Katja Kuhl. It was filmed at the Slapy Castle in Slapy, a municipality and village in Prague-West District in the Central Bohemian Region of the Czech Republic. The visuals use the Radio Streetmix of "V.I.P.," also produced by Peter Ries, instead of both the album or the radiocut version.

== Track listings ==
Maxi single
No.	Title	Writer(s)	Producer(s)	Length
1.	"V.I.P." (radiocut with rap)	Pete Kirtley; Tim Hawes; Q; Darius Rustrum; Shaham Joyce; Faiz Mangat	Peter Ries	3:30
2.	"V.I.P." (radiocut without rap)	Kirtley; Hawes; Q; Rustrum	Ries	3:30
3.	"V.I.P." (radio streetmix with rap)	Kirtley; Hawes; Q; Rustrum; Joyce; Mangat	Ries	3:30
4.	"V.I.P." (cut II)	Kirtley; Hawes; Q; Rustrum	Ries	3:31
5.	"V.I.P." (Karaoke Version)	Kirtley; Hawes; Q; Rustrum	Ries	3:52
6.	"Days of Our Lives" (live at Heat Music, Walldorf 2003)	Nick Manic; Peter Sjöström	Thorsten Brötzmann	3:27

== Credits and personnel ==
- Ross Antony – vocals
- Hila Bronstein – vocals
- Nik Hafeman – vocal arrangement, recording, supervising producer
- Trevor Hurts – recording
- Shaham Joyce – vocals
- Faiz Mangat – vocals
- Peter Ries – production, vocal arrangement, recording, mixing
- Ossi Schaller – guitars
- Indira Weis – vocals
- Giovanni Zarrella – vocals

== Charts ==
Weekly chart performance for "V.I.P."
Chart (2003)	Peak position
Germany (GfK)	19
