= U Build Me Up =

Single by Bro'Sis

from the album Showtime
- Released: March 30, 2004
- Length: 4:35
- Label: Cheyenne; Polydor; Zeitgeist
- Songwriter(s): Blair MacKichan
- Producer(s): Fredrik "Fredro" Ödesjö

Bro'Sis singles chronology
"V.I.P." (2003)	"U Build Me Up" (2004)	"Make Up Your Mind" (2004)

"U Build Me Up" is a song by the German pop group Bro'Sis. It was written by British songwriter Blair MacKichan and produced by Fredrik "Fredro" Ödesjö for the band's third studio album Showtime (2004). The mid-tempo track was released by Cheyenne Records as the album's sole physical single on March 30, 2004 and reached the top twenty of the German Singles Chart.

== Music video ==
A music video for "U Build Me Up" was directed by Katja Kuhl.

== Track listing ==
Maxi single
No.	Title	Writer(s)	Producer(s)	Length
1.	"U Build Me Up" (radio/video edit)	Blair MacKichan	Fredrik "Fredro" Ödesjö; Henrik Brunberg^{[a]}	3:34
2.	"U Build Me Up" (B&B remix)	Giovanni Zarrella; Lou Luca; Nico Tonidis; Uli Wenzel; Uwe Sessler	Ödesjö	4:01
3.	"U Build Me Up" (Longversion)	MacKichan	Ödesjö	4:35
4.	"U Build Me Up" (Instrumental)	MacKichan	Ödesjö	3:28

Notes

- ^{^a} signifies additional editor(s)

== Credits and personnel ==
- Ross Antony – vocals
- Mats Berntoft – bass, guitar
- Hila Bronstein – vocals
- Henrik Brunberg – radio editing
- Nik Hafeman – supervising producer
- Shaham Joyce – vocals
- Toby Lindell – mixing
- Faiz Mangat – vocals
- Fredrik "Fredro" Ödesjö – production, recording
- Giovanni Zarrella – vocals

== Charts ==
Weekly chart performance for "U Build Me Up"
Chart (2004)	Peak position
Austria (Ö3 Austria Top 40)	51
Germany (GfK)	20
