= Oh No (Bro'Sis song) =

2003 single by Bro'Sis

Single by Bro'Sis

from the album Days of Our Lives
- A-side: "Never Stop"
- Released: 7 April 2003
- Length: 4:08
- Label: Cheyenne; Polydor; Zeitgeist
- Songwriter(s): Marc Mozart; Andy Love
- Producer(s): Marc Mozart; John Eaton

Bro'Sis singles chronology
"Never Stop" (2002)	"Oh No" / "Never Stop" (2003)	"V.I.P." (2003)

"Oh No" is a song by German pop group Bro'Sis. It was written by Marc Mozart and Andy Love and produced by the former along with John Eaton for the band's second studio album Days of Our Lives (2003). Released as the album's lead single on 7 April 2003 on double A-side with their German Football Association hymn "Never Stop", the latin pop-influenced uptempo track became the group's sixth and final top ten entry on the German Singles Chart, peaking at number seven. It also marked the band's final release with Indira Weis who would announce her departure from Bro'Sis the following month.

== Music video ==
A music video for "Oh No" was directed by Katja Kuhl. It was filmed from 13–14 March 2003 on Majorca, the largest of the Balearic Islands. Several locations throughout the island were used as filming locations, including Salinas d'Es Trenc.

== Track listing ==
Maxi single
No.	Title	Writer(s)	Producer(s)	Length
1.	"Oh No" (radio edit)	Marc Mozart; Andy Love	Mozart; John Eaton	3:30
2.	"Oh No" (extended version)	Mozart; Love	Mozart; Eaton	4:10
3.	"Oh No" (D'Klay's urban rmx 2003)	Mozart; Love	Mozart; Eaton; Don Curry^{[a]}	3:59
4.	"Oh No" (The Futurehit Hell's Kitchen remix)	Mozart; Love	Mozart; Eaton; Futurehit^{[a]}	4:07
5.	"Never Stop"	Jens Klein; Anders Herrlin; Jennie Löfgren	Thorsten Brötzmann	3:13

Notes

- ^{^a} signifies additional producer(s)

== Credits and personnel ==
- Ross Antony – vocals
- Hila Bronstein – vocals
- John Eaton – production, recording
- Nik Hafeman – recording
- Shaham Joyce – vocals
- Faiz Mangat – vocals
- Marc Mozart – production, mixing, recording
- Indira Weis – vocals
- Giovanni Zarrella – vocals

== Charts ==
=== Weekly charts ===
Weekly chart performance for "Oh No" / "Never Stop"
Chart (2003)	Peak position
Austria (Ö3 Austria Top 40)	24
Germany (GfK)	7
Switzerland (Schweizer Hitparade)	66

=== Year-end charts ===
Year-end chart performance for "Oh No" / "Never Stop"
Chart (2003)	Position
Germany (Media Control GfK)	100
