= Hot Temptation =

Single by Bro'Sis

from the album Never Forget (Where You Come From)
- Released: 21 October 2002
- Length: 3:05
- Label: Cheyenne; Polydor; Zeitgeist
- Songwriters: Douglas Carr; Christian Waltz
- Producer: Axel Breitung

Bro'Sis singles chronology
"Heaven Must Be Missing an Angel" (2002)	"Hot Temptation" (2002)	"The Gift" (2002)

"Hot Temptation" is a song by German pop group Bro'Sis. It was written by Douglas Carr and Christian Waltz and produced by Axel Breitung for the Special Winter Edition reissue of the band's debut studio album Never Forget (Where You Come From) (2002). Released by Cheyenne Records on 21 October 2002 as the re-release's first single, the previously unreleased song reached number 11 on the Austrian Singles Chart and became another top five hit for the band in Germany.

== Music video ==
A music video for "Hot Temptation" was directed by Katja Kuhl.

== Track listing ==
Maxi single
No.	Title	Writer(s)	Producer(s)	Length
1.	"Hot Temptation" (single version)	Douglas Carr; Christian Waltz	Axel Breitung	3:05
2.	"Hot Temptation" (radio edit)	Carr; Waltz	Breitung	3:05
3.	"Hot Temptation" (rap radio edit)	Carr; Waltz	Breitung	3:12
4.	"Hot Temptation" (video edit)	Carr; Waltz	Breitung	3:20
5.	"In the Cradle"	Harry Chapin; Sandra Chapin	Marc Mozart; John Eaton	3:00

== Credits and personnel ==
- Ross Antony – vocals
- Axel Breitung – production
- Hila Bronstein – vocals
- Shaham Joyce – vocals
- Faiz Mangat – vocals
- Indira Weis – vocals
- Giovanni Zarrella – vocals

== Charts ==
=== Weekly charts ===
Weekly chart performance for "Hot Temptation"
Chart (2002)	Peak position
Austria (Ö3 Austria Top 40)	11
Germany (GfK)	4
Switzerland (Schweizer Hitparade)	46

=== Year-end charts ===
Year-endchart performance for "Hot Temptation"
Chart (2002)	Position
Germany (Media Control)	98
