= Popstars – Du bist mein Traum =

- Created by: Jonathan Dowling
- Starring: No Angels; Detlef "D!" Soost; Bro'Sis
- Country of origin: Germany
- No. of episodes: 30

Production
- Camera setup: Multi-camera
- Running time: 60 min.

Original release
- Release: 11 September – 23 December 2001

Related
- Popstars (season 1); Popstars – Das Duell

In September 2001, the German version of Popstars returned with a second season, this time searching for a mixed-gender musical R&B group. More than 11,000 hopeful singers attended open television auditions in Frankfurt, Cologne, Berlin, Stuttgart, Hamburg, and Munich, conducted by choreographer Detlef "D!" Soost, producer Alex Christensen, and singer and radio host Noah Sow. Over the course of several recalls and re-recalls the three judges and vocal coach Artemis Gounaki reduced the contestants to a group of 32 who immediately travelled to Ibiza, Spain to get trained in singing, dancing, and fitness. In the end three females and five males remained who again moved into a loft in Munich to start working on their performance and publicity skills.

During a special episode on 11 November 2001, judges Soost and Christensen eventually disclosed that Ross Antony, Hila Bronstein, Shaham Joyce, Faiz Mangat, Indira Weis, and Giovanni Zarrella were chosen to become part of the multicultural group Bro'Sis.

| "Bandhaus" contestant | Elimination broadcast on |
|---|---|
| Ross Antony | 11 November 2001 |
| Hila Bronstein | 11 November 2001 |
| Shaham Joyce | 11 November 2001 |
| Faiz Mangat | 11 November 2001 |
| Indira Weis | 11 November 2001 |
| Giovanni Zarrella | 11 November 2001 |
| Darja Schabad | 4 November 2001 |
| David Korinth | 4 November 2001 |

The contestant became part of the winning band Bro'Sis.
The contestant made it to the final eight.

Title translation: You Are My Dream
Winning band: Bro'Sis
Judges: Alex Christensen, Detlef Soost, Noah Sow
Coaches: Artemis Gounaki (singing), D. Soost (dancing)

== Television ratings ==
Germany

| Episode | from 3 years | | 14-to-49-year-old | |
| Episode | Viewers (in millions) | Share (in %) | Viewers (in millions) | Share (in %) |
|---|---|---|---|---|
| Series | 1,71 | | | |
