= Popstars – Das Duell =

Talent show

- Created by: Jonathan Dowling
- Starring: Preluders; Detlef "D!" Soost; Overground
- Opening theme: "Come As You Are"
- Country of origin: Germany
- No. of episodes: 20 (including specials)

Production
- Camera setup: Multi-camera
- Running time: 90 min.: Castings, The Show, Workshop, Finale; 60 min.: Roadshow, Special

Original release
- Network: ProSieben
- Release: 2003 – December 2003

Related
- Popstars – Du bist mein Traum; Popstars – Jetzt oder nie!

Popstars – Das Duell ("Popstars – The Battle") was an interactive reality, talent show broadcast in Germany during late 2003. It is the third German season of the international Popstars franchise. Unlike the first two seasons of Popstars, which resulted in the formation of one winning group (No Angels and Bro'Sis), Popstars – Das Duell created two rival groups who competed against each other for the most records sold. This show created Overground and Preluders. This season's catch phrase is "Lebe deine Traum" which means "Live Your Dream". Winners were the male band Overground. From 11 August 2003 to 3 November 2003, there was a special magazine about Popstars on TV called "taff. – Popstars Special" every Monday at 6 pm.

The show consists of three phases. First phase is audition phase in which young aspiring singers can apply on six German cities (Stuttgart, Cologne, Hamburg, Frankfurt and Berlin). After the contestants had gone through a casting, a "Re-Call" and a "Re-ReCall", they united in a decision show in which the best 30–40 contestants were allowed to pass through to the next phase, the Workshop, in which two groups were formed. The groups battle in a Roadshow in which both bands promote their single and a tour. After the Roadshow the winning band was crowned in a big Live-Finale on 3 November 2003.

Title translation: The Battle
Winning band: Overground
Judges: Sabrina Setlur, Detlef Soost, Uwe Fahrenkrog-Petersen
Coaches: Artemis Gounaki (singing), D. Soost (dancing)

== Episodes ==
=== Episode 1: The Casting I ===
First Aired: 11 August 2003

=== Episode 2: The Casting II ===
First Aired: 18 August 2003

=== Episode 3: The Casting III ===
First Aired: 25 August 2003

=== Episode 4: The Show ===
First Aired: 1 September 2003

46 chosen-ones compete in a big decision show at an airport in Düsseldorf. The best talents were given a ticket to the plane to the Workshop in Orlando.

=== Episode 5: The Workshop I ===
First Aired: 8 September 2003

=== Episode 6: The Workshop II ===
First Aired: 15 September 2003

=== Episode 7: The Workshop III ===
First Aired: 22 September 2003

=== Episode 8: The Workshop IV ===
First Aired: 29 September 2003

=== Special Episode: The 12 finalists - Who will make the band? ===
First Aired: 30 September 2003

Portray of the finalist...

=== Episode 10: Roadshow I ===
First Aired: 6 October 2003

Decision: these are the rival bands.

=== Episode 11: Roadshow II ===
First Aired: 10 October 2003

Preparations for the Tour in Berlin. Anne Ross and Fabrizio Levita are sent in to make the bands stronger.

=== Episode 12: Roadshow III ===
First Aired: 13 October 2003

Tour starts...

=== Episode 13: Roadshow IV ===
First Aired: 17 October 2003

The Bands on Tour...

=== Episode 14: Roadshow V ===
First Aired: 20 October 2003

The Bands on Tour...

=== Episode 15: Roadshow VI ===
First Aired: 24 October 2003

The Bands on Tour...

=== Episode 16: Roadshow VII ===
First Aired: 27 October 2003

The Bands on Tour...

=== Special Episode: My Way Into The Finale - "Preluders and Overground. The Stars Privat. Their Fears, Their Hopes, Their Plans" ===
First Aired: 31 October 2003

Arabella Kiesbauer speaks in exclusive one-man-interviews with all nine finalists about their fears, their visions, if Popstars or not.

=== Special Episode: The Countdown - "Two Days Left Until Decision" ===
First Aired: 1 November 2003

Special for a half an hour... Arabella takes a look behind the scenes of the Germany Tour of the Preluders and Overground.

=== Special Episode: The Countdown - "Behind the Scenes of the Finale-Show" ===
First Aired: 2 November 2003

Special for a half an hour... Arabella presents everything around the big Finale backstage: the studio, the styling, mask and the final trainings...

=== Episode 17: Finale ===
First Aired: 3 November 2003

Winning band is revealed: Overground

Host: Arabella Kiesbauer

Calls: 2,5 mil.

=== Television ratings ===
Germany

Episode	from 3 years		14-to-49-year-old	
Episode	Viewers (in millions)	Share (in %)	Viewers (in millions)	Share (in %)
1. Casting I	1,96	8,5	1,45	15,5
2. Casting II	2,21	7,7	1,74	14,5
3. Casting III				
4. The Show				
5. Workshop I				
6. Workshop II	2,43	8,4		16,9
7. Workshop III	2,58	8,8	2,21	17,1
8. Workshop IV				18,5
Special	2,80			17,7
10. Roadshow I	3,66	11,3	3,01	21,3
11. Roadshow II	2,0			13
12. Roadshow III				
13. Roadshow IV			1,76	10,6
14. Roadshow V	2,50	7,5		14,5
15. Roadshow VI	1,76	5,5		10,6
16. Roadshow VII	3,17	9,4		17,6
My Way Into The Finale	1,28	4,2		8,3
17. Finale	3,7	11,6	3,08	22,3
