= World League eSport Bundesliga =

E-Sports-Competition

- Sport: Counter-Strike; Counter-Strike: Source; FIFA 06
- Folded: 2006?
- Country: Germany
- Broadcaster: Deutsches Sportfernsehen

The World League eSport Bundesliga was a German professional electronic sports league featuring the Counter-Strike, Counter-Strike: Source and FIFA 06 series. It has its own TV-show, broadcast by the German television channel Deutsches Sportfernsehen. Jana Ina and Giovanni Zarrella are the hosts of the show. The only game that was played at the season World League eSport Bundesliga was FIFA 06. The competitors fought for prize money of €50,000. From December 2005 until May 2006 there was a postseason, in which prize money of €45,825 was paid out.

== League structure ==
The structure of the World League eSport Bundesliga is based on the German Bundesliga. Each league consists of 18 players and all games of the first Bundesliga are played at the CineStar IMAX it the Sony Center in Berlin.

Class
League/Division
1
1. Bundesliga (3 relegations)

(Offline)

2
2. Bundesliga (3 relegations, 3 promotions)

(Online)

3
3. Bundesliga (6 relegations, 3 promotions)

(Online)

4
Oberliga (6 relegations, 6 promotions)

(4-tracked / Online)

5
Kreisklasse (3 promotions)

(8-tracked / Online)

Besides the five leagues there is the ESBL Trophy which is similar to the DFB-Pokal. All Contesters of the 1. Bundesliga, 2. Bundesliga, 3. Bundesliga and Oberliga take part in this tournament. At the Quarterfinals and above the matches are also played in the so-called eSportstadium at the CineStar IMAX it the Sony Center in Berlin.

== Previous winners ==
=== Season 2005/2006 ===
==== Counter-Strike ====
- ESBL Masters: Team 64 AMD
- 1. Bundesliga: mousesports
- ESBL Trophy: ID Gaming

==== Counter-Strike:Source ====
- 1. Bundesliga: Team Dignitas

==== FIFA 2005 ====
- 1. Bundesliga: SK Gaming
- ESBL Trophy: SK Gaming
