= Rasmus Bille Bahncke =

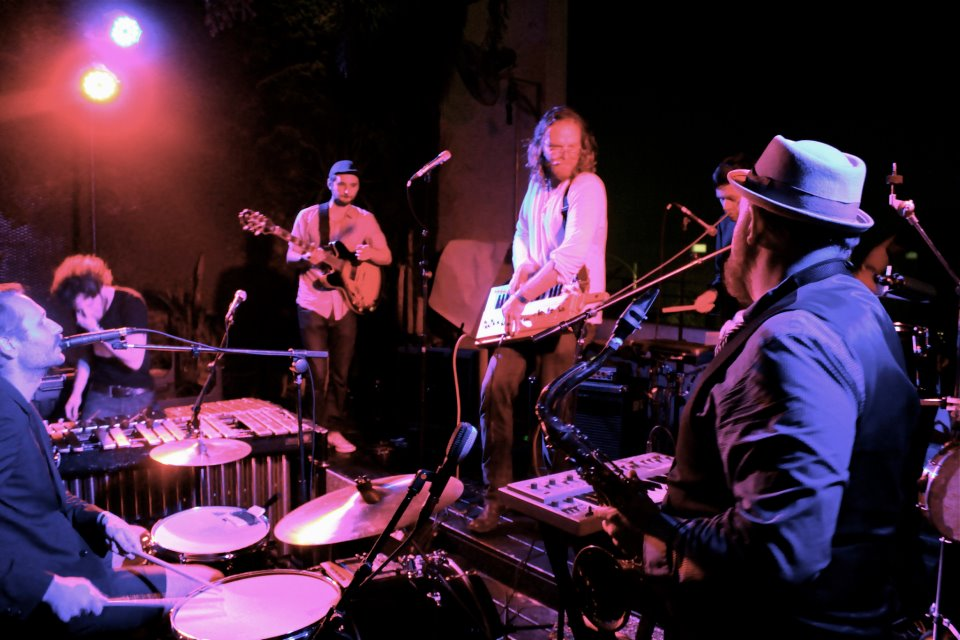

Background information
- Born: Rasmus Bille Bahncke
- Occupations: Songwriter, record producer
- Years active: 1997–present

Rasmus Bille Bahncke is a Danish songwriter, record producer and keyboardist. He is a founding member of production team Supaflyas and part of New York-based studio This Is Care Of.

As a songwriter and producer he has worked for Backstreet Boys, CeCe Winans, Sting, Blue, Miley Cyrus, Aura Dione, Fagget Fairys and Hessismore.

- Notable Prize achievements: 48th Grammy Awards - Certificate of Recognition presented to Supaflyas achieved for production work on Grammy Award winning song "Pray" by US recording artist Cece Winans

== Discography ==
Year	Artist	Album	Song	Details
2011	Hess Is More	Going Looking For The End Of The World0 - Single EP	"Going Looking For The End Of The World" (Bille Bahncke Remix)	Co-writer, producer
2011	Hess Is More	Going Looking For The End Of The World0 - Single EP	"Going Looking For The End Of The World" (Bille Bahncke Remix) (Radio Edit)	Co-writer, producer
2011	Hess Is More	Creation Keeps The Devil Away	"Twelve Bells"	Producer
2011	Hess Is More	Creation Keeps The Devil Away	"What's On The Second Floor?"	Producer
2011	Hess Is More	Creation Keeps The Devil Away	"Going Looking For The End Of The World"	Co-writer, producer
2011	Hess Is More	Creation Keeps The Devil Away	"Burn"	Producer
2011	Hess Is More	Creation Keeps The Devil Away	"Go Go Go Go"	Producer
2011	Hess Is More	Creation Keeps The Devil Away	"Wonder Who You're Singing For"	Co-writer, producer
2011	Hess Is More	Creation Keeps The Devil Away	"Call For Change" (feat. Nomi Ruiz)	Producer
2011	Hess Is More	Creation Keeps The Devil Away	"Circling High"	Producer
2011	Hess Is More	Creation Keeps The Devil Away	"Creation Keeps The Devil Away"	Producer
2011	Hess Is More	Burn - Single EP	"Burn"	Producer
2011	Fagget Fairys	Black Hole	"Black Hole"	Co-writer, producer
2011	Fagget Fairys	Black Hole	"Turkish Delight"	Co-writer, producer
2011	Fagget Fairys	Turkish Delight - Single EP	"Turkish Delight"	Co-writer, producer
2011	Hess Is More	Creation Keeps The Devil Away - Single EP	"Creation Keeps The Devil Away"	Producer
2011	Forever The Sickest Kids	Forever The Sickest Kids	"Same Dumb Excuse"	Co-writer, producer
2011	Forever The Sickest Kids	Forever The Sickest Kids	"Nothing To Lose"	Co-writer, producer
2010	Kimberley Locke	Strobelight - Single EP	"Strobelight"	Co-writer, producer
2010	The Kenneth Bager Experience	Fragments From A Space Cadet 2	"Fragment 25"	Co-writer, producer
2010	The Kenneth Bager Experience	Fragments From A Space Cadet 2	"Shake It"	Co-writer, producer
2010	The Kenneth Bager Experience	Fragment One (...And I Kept Hearing) - Single EP	"Fragment One (...And I Kept Hearing)" (Fagget Fairys Remix)	Producer
2009	Aura Dione	Colombine	"I Will Love You Monday" (Fagget Fairys Remix)	Producer
2009	Fagget Fairys	Feed The Horse	"Roll The Dice"	Co-writer, producer
2009	Fagget Fairys	Feed The Horse	"All I Want"	Co-writer, producer
2009	Fagget Fairys	Feed The Horse	"Oci"	Co-writer, producer
2009	Fagget Fairys	Feed The Horse	"Feed The Horse"	Co-writer, producer
2009	Fagget Fairys	Feed The Horse	"Mary Jane"	Co-writer, producer
2009	Fagget Fairys	Feed The Horse	"Uzmi"	Co-writer, producer
2009	Fagget Fairys	Feed The Horse	"This Thing I Do"	Co-writer, producer
2009	Miley Cyrus	Hannah Montana: The Movie (soundtrack)	"Hoedown Throwdown"	Producer
2009	Fagget Fairys	Roll The Dice - Single EP	"Roll The Dice"	Co-writer, producer
2008	Vanessa Hudgens & Zac Efron	High School Musical 3: Senior Year	"Can I Have This Dance"	Producer
2008	Fagget Fairys	Feed The Horse - Single EP	"Feed The Horse"	Co-writer, producer
2008	Deleon Richards	Here In Me	"Let Go Let God"	Co-writer, producer
2007	Nick Lachey	What's Left Of Me - Single EP	"Don't Shut Me Out"	Producer
2007	Ashley Tisdale	Headstrong	"Don't Touch"	Co-writer, producer
2007	Clay Aiken	A Thousand Different Ways	"Here You Come Again"	Producer
2007	Clay Aiken	A Thousand Different Ways	"Everytime You Go Away"	Producer
2006	Brian Littrell	Welcome Home	"Angels & Heroes"	Co-writer
2006	Tata Young	Temperature Rising	"Back Outta This"	Co-writer, producer
2006	Tata Young	Temperature Rising	"Zoom"	Co-writer, producer
2006	Tarkan	Come Closer	"I Wanna Hear Love Speak"	Co-writer, producer
2006	Joyce Sims	Come Into My Life - Remixes	"Come Into My Life" (Supaflyas Remix)	Producer
2006	Leehom Wang	Heroes Of Earth	"Do Ya"	Co-writer, producer
2005	Backstreet Boys	Never Gone	"Poster Girl"	Co-writer, producer
2005	CeCe Winans	Purified	"Pray"	Producer
2005	Jon	Today Is A Good Day (To Fall In Love)	"Deep Down"	Co-writer, producer
2005	Random feat. Rudy	Put Your Hands Up - Single EP	"Put Your Hands Upl"	Co-writer, producer
2005	VS	If You Leave Me Know - Single EP	"If You Leave Me Know"	Producer
2004	Sting & Mary J. Blige	Whenever I Say Your Name - Single EP	"Whenever I Say Your Name" (Billy Mann / Supaflyas Mix)	Producer
2004	Shaznay Lewis	Open	"On The Radio"	Co-writer, producer
2004	Won-G	Rage Of The Age	"My Life"	Co-writer, producer
2004	Won-G	Rage Of The Age	"Take Me Home"	Co-writer, producer
2004	Won-G	Rage Of The Age	"I Love You"	Co-writer, producer
2004	Jody Lei	Reminisce - Single EP	"Reminisce"	Co-writer, producer
2004	Play	Don't Stop The Music	"You Found Me"	Co-writer, producer
2003	Jennifer Brown	Home	"Weak"	Co-writer, producer
2003	Jennifer Brown	Home	"Million Dollar House"	Co-writer, producer
2003	Jennifer Brown	Home	"Trouble In Mind"	Co-writer, producer
2003	Jennifer Brown	Home	"Just The Way It Goes"	Co-writer, producer
2003	Jennifer Brown	Home	"When I Look In The Mirror"	Co-writer, producer
2003	Blue	Guilty	"I Wanna Know"	Co-writer, producer
2003	Nikki Cleary feat. Chris Trousdale	Nikki Cleary	"You're The One That I Want"	Producer
2002	Blue feat. Elton John	Sorry Seems To Be The Hardest Word - EP	"Sweet Thing"	Co-writer, producer
2002	Blue	One Love	"Privacy"	Co-writer, producer
2002	Luis Fonsi	Fight The Feeling	"You Got Nothing On Me"	Co-writer, producer
2002	Take 5	Against All Odds	"Missing An Angel"	Co-writer
2002	Bro'Sis	Never Forget (Where You Come From)	"Heaven Must Be Missing An Angel"	Co-writer, producer
2001	Kristine Blond	All I Ever Wanted	"You Make Me Go Oooh"	Co-writer, producer
2001	Kristine Blond	All I Ever Wanted	"Naturally"	Co-writer, producer
2001	Kristine Blond	You Make Me Go Oooh - Single EP	"You Make Me Go Oooh"	Co-writer, producer
2001	Hear'Say	The Way To Your Love	"Look Inside Yourself"	Co-writer, producer
2001	Den Gale Pose	Definitionen Af En Stodder - Album	"Definitionen Af En Stodder"	Co-writer
2001	Den Gale Pose	Definitionen Af En Stodder - Single EP	"Definitionen Af En Stodder" (Stodder Mix)	Co-writer, producer
2000	Outlandish	Outland's Official	"Wherever"	Co-writer
2000	Outlandish	Outland's Official	"Come On"	Co-writer, producer
2000	DaRock	Fiesta Forever - Single EP	"Fiesta Forever"	Co-writer, producer
2000	S.O.A.P.	Miracle	"Give It All You Got"	Co-writer, producer
2000	Loretta	Trouble With Boys	"All Because Of You"	Co-writer, producer
2000	Sweet Female Attitude	In Person	"8 Days A Week" (Supaflyas Remix)	Producer
2000	Sweet Female Attitude	In Person	"Flowers" (Supaflyas Remix)	Producer
2000	Sweet Female Attitude	8 Days A Week - Single EP	"8 Days A Week" (Supaflyas Remix)	Producer
2000	Sweet Female Attitude	Flowers - Single EP	"Flowers" (Supaflyas Remix)	Producer
2000	Danseorkestret	Spred Vingerne Ud	"Sidste Skrig" (Supaflyas Remix)	Producer
1999	Another Level	Nexus	"We'll Meet Again"	Co-writer, producer
1999	Excel	Bright Lights Big City	"Bright Lights Big City"	Co-writer, producer
1999	Excel	Bright Lights Big City	"Pump"	Co-writer, producer
1999	Excel	Bright Lights Big City	"I Feel For You"	Producer
1999	Excel	Pump - Single EP	"Pump"	Co-writer, producer
1998	Excel	All Night Long - Single EP	"All Night Long" (Supaflyas Remix)	Producer
1998	Juice	Best Days - Single EP	"Best Days" (Denmack Remix)	Producer
1998	Clemens	Den Anden Verden	"Når Du Går"	Co-writer, producer
1998	Den Gale Pose	Sådan Er Reglerne	"Spændt Op Til Lir" (Radio Mix)	Producer
1998	Den Gale Pose	Sådan Er Reglerne	"Proletar Superstar feat. Shirley"	Co-writer, producer
1998	Den Gale Pose	Bonnie & Clyde - Single EP	"Bonnie & Clyde" (Denmack Radio Mix)	Producer
1998	Den Gale Pose	Spændt Op Til Lir - Single EP	"Spændt Op Til Lir" (Radio Mix)	Producer
1998	TV-2	Yndlingsbabe - Single EP	"Yndlingsbabe" (Supaflyas Remix)	Producer
1998	Christina	Watching You	"I Wanna Be Your Lover"	Producer
1998	Christina	I Wanna Be Your Lover - Single EP	"I Wanna Be Your Lover"	Producer
1998	Los Umbrellos	Drive - Single EP	"Drive" (Supaflyas Radio Mix)	Producer
1998	Los Umbrellos	Drive - Single EP	"Drive" (Supaflyas Club Mix)	Producer
1997	Hvid Sjokolade	Jo Hårdere De Kommer - Single EP	"Jo Hårdere De Kommer" (Supaflyas Remix)	Producer
1997	Daniel	Simplified	"Simplified"	Co-writer, producer
1997	Daniel	Simplified	"Hookline"	Co-writer, producer
1997	Daniel	Simplified	"R U Free"	Co-writer, producer
1997	Daniel	Simplified	"Head Over Heels"	Co-writer, producer
1997	Daniel	Simplified	"Let Up"	Co-writer, producer
1997	Daniel	Simplified	"Tonite Is Your Nite"	Co-writer, producer
1997	Daniel	Simplified	"You Know"	Co-writer, producer

Discography Source
