= Jana Ina =

Germany-based television personality (born 1976)

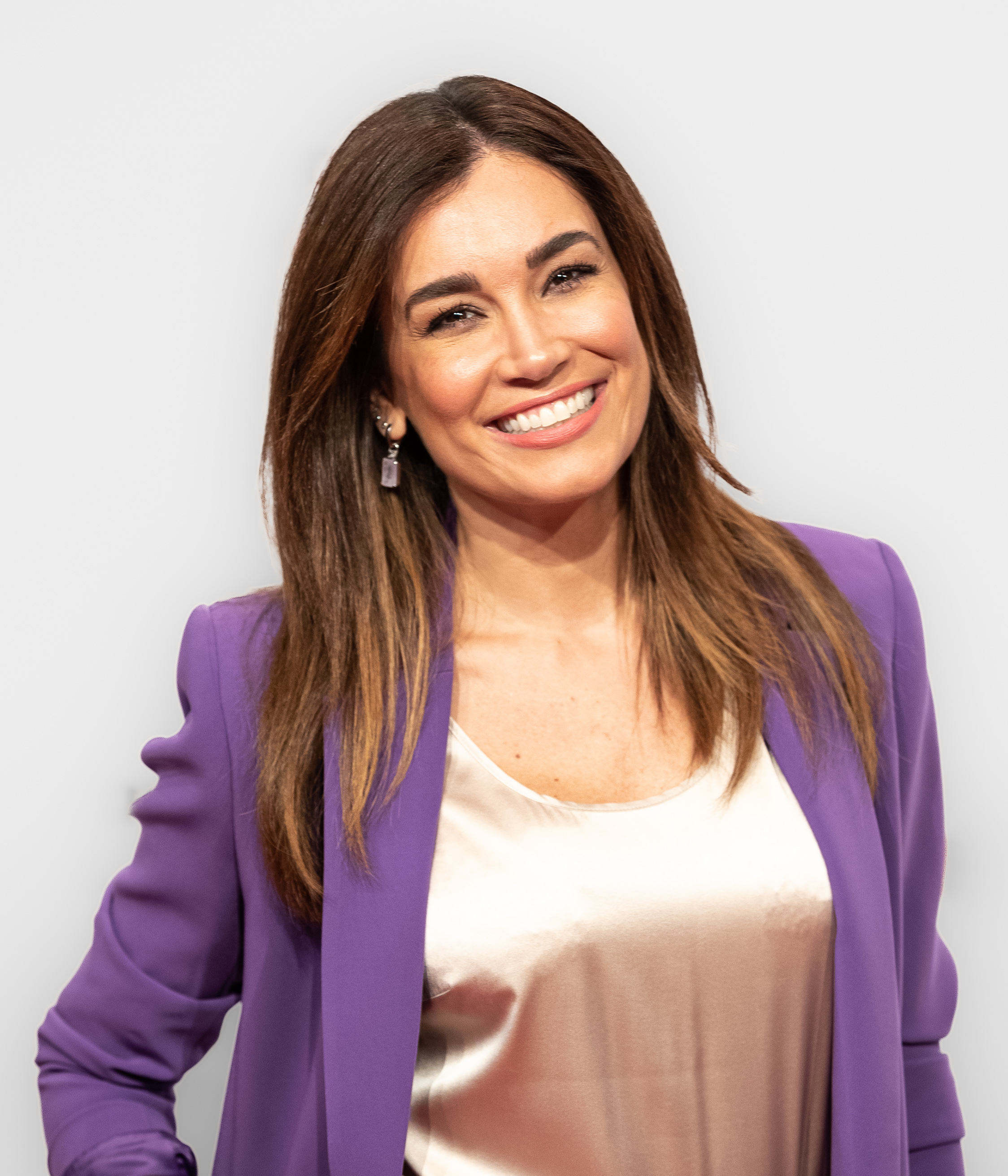
- Ina in 2020
- Born: Janaína Vizeu Berenhauser Borba; 12 December 1976 (age 49); Petropolis, Rio de Janeiro, Brazil
- Other names: Jana Ina Zarrella; Janaína Zarrella
- Occupations: Television presenter, model, singer
- Years active: 2000s–present
- Spouse: Giovanni Zarrella (m. 2005)
- Website: jana-ina.de

Janaína Zarrella (born Janaína Vizeu Berenhauser Borba; 12 December 1976), more commonly known as Jana Ina, is a Brazilian television personality and presenter based in Germany.

== Biography ==
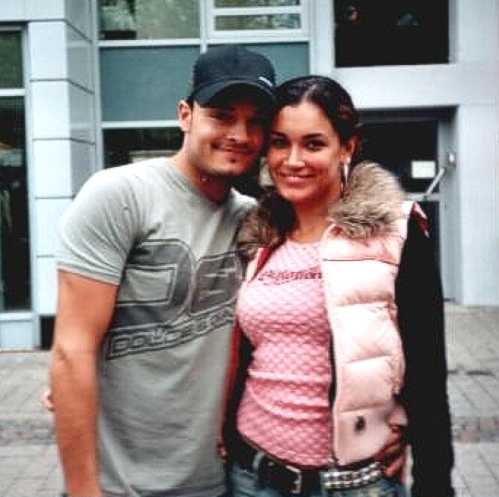
Jana Ina with her husband Giovanni Zarrella in 2005

Jana Ina was born in Petrópolis, a city of the state of Rio de Janeiro, where she took up a number of dancing classes including salsa, mambo, ballet, jazz and samba. She took singing classes for eleven years and sang in a choir as a backup singer. At 15, she signed up at a modelling agency. After completing school in 1994, she began studying journalism at the State University of Rio de Janeiro.

In 1999, Jana Ina moved to Germany, where her great-grandparents are originally from. Soon after moving, she received offers to record an album. She performed at numerous beauty pageants and international events, such as the Miss Intercontinental contest, in which she served as a juror as well.

From March 2004 to March 2006, Jana Ina worked for GIGA, hosting the five-hour afternoon show NBC GIGA. From August 2006, she hosted the Games of the World League eSport Bundesliga.

Jana Ina is married to Giovanni Zarrella and has a son.

== Singles ==
- 2002: "Yo te quiero"
- 2003: "Make My Day"
- 2003: "Tanze Samba mit mir" (with Hape Kerkeling)

== Filmography ==
=== Films ===
- 2004: Samba in Mettmann
- 2006: Mr. Nanny (TV film, ZDF)

=== TV series ===
- 2004–2006: Network reporter at GIGA
- 2007: The Model and the Freak
- 2008: Jana Ina & Giovanni - We're Pregnant
- 2010: Jana Ina & Giovanni - Pizza, Pasta & Amore
- 2017: Curvy Supermodel
