= Snowblind (film) =

2010 film

- Theatrical release poster
- Directed by: Kilian Manning
- Written by: Kalle Max Hofmann
- Produced by: MangoFilms
- Starring: Robert Lyons; Mala Ghedia; Erik Hansen
- Distributed by: MangoFilms
- Release date: June 7, 2010 (Filmfest Emden)
- Running time: 95 minutes
- Country: United States
- Language: English

Snowblind is a 2010 German Western independent film about a post-apocalyptic world after an ice-age devastated civilization.

The film was released in 2010, and was produced by Mangofilm. It was also released on Blu-ray and in 3D. It is made free for personal distribution on torrent sites under the Creative Commons License, as long as money is not charged.

The movie is also known as Snowblind 3D.

== Plot ==
In this post-apocalyptic spaghetti western, a governor pardons a gunslinger sentenced to death, in order to have him kill another gunslinger. He doesn't tell about the girl; complications ensue.

== Cast ==
- Robert Lyons as Clayton Young
- Mala Ghedia as Naina Saberneck
- Erik Hansen as Matthew Saberneck
- Jana Pallaske as Barbara Midnite
- Dharmander Singh as Governor Bhavesh Lafort
- Albee Lesotho as Marshal Phillip Clarke
- Wim Wenders as Gray Fox
- Angus McGruther as Virgil Dakota
- Christian Serritiello as Deputy Frank Holden
- Ricky Watson as Duke Thompson
- Mathias Jürgens as Johnny Levi
- Stephen Patrick Hanna as Sheriff Jack Palance
- Indira Weis as Kassie Kalifornia
- Elisa Duca as Maria Cotrelli
- Nadine Petry as Chili Bean
