= Days of Our Lives (Bro'Sis album) =

Studio album by Bro'Sis
- Released: 13 May 2003
- Length: 47:19
- Label: Cheyenne; Polydor; Zeitgeist
- Producer: Thorsten Brötzmann; David Brunner; John Eaton; Peter Hoff; Ken & Jon; Marc Mozart; Daniel Pandher; Christoph Papendieck; Peter Ries; Sven Schumacher; Gary Wallis

Bro'Sis chronology
Never Forget (2002)	Days of Our Lives (2003)	Showtime (2004)

Days of Our Lives is the second studio album by German pop group Bro'Sis. It was released on 13 May 2003, by Cheyenne Records, Polydor and Zeitgeist. It was primarily produced by Thorsten Brötzmann, with additional production from Peter Ries, Marc Mozart, Ken & Jon, and others. The album reached the top ten in Germany. Days of our Lives spawned two singles, including double A-single "Oh No"/"Never Stop" and a single remix of "V.I.P.", the band's first release without original bandmate Indira Weis.

== Critical reception ==
Professional ratings
Review scores
Source	Rating
laut.de	2/5 stars

Alexander Cordas from laut.de found that "the producer team behaves cheekily towards the end of the catastrophe [...] The motto "steal here and steal there, make it Bro'Sis trallala" is the quintessence of the album. When trying to tailor urban sounds to Bro'Sis' provincial balls, the songwriters, producers and band fail miserably."

== Commercial performance ==
Days of Our Lives achieved a moderate level of commercial success across German-speaking Europe, though it fell short of the stronger performance of the group's previous release Never Forget (Where You Come From) (2001). In Germany, the album reached its highest position at number 10 on the German Albums Chart, marking its most successful market. In Austria, it peaked at number 37 on the Austrian Albums Chart, while in Switzerland it reached number 39 on the Schweizer Hitparade, indicating comparatively limited traction in both markets.

== Track listing ==
Days of Our Lives track listing
No.	Title	Writer(s)	Producer(s)	Length
1.	"Oh No" (Extended Version)	Marc Mozart; Andy Love	Mozart; John Eaton	4:08
2.	"V.I.P."	Pete Kirtley; Tim Hawes; Q; Darius Rustrum	Peter Ries	4:10
3.	"Days of Our Lives"	Nick Manic; Peter Sjöström	Thorsten Brötzmann	3:28
4.	"Attenzione"	David Brunner; Sebastian Kirchner; Kaynee Tracks; Toni Works; S-Key; Salvatore Di Blasi	Brunner	3:27
5.	"Put Your Hands Up"	Peter Hoff; Sandra Schorlemmer; David Bruce Whitley	Hoff	3:22
6.	"Never Stop" (Rock Version)	Jens Klein; Anders Herrlin; Anna Jenny Loefgrin	Brötzmann	3:13
7.	"Where Would I Be"	Kevin Hughes; Andrew Frampton	Brötzmann	4:10
8.	"It's Alright With Me"	Craig Hardy; Walter Turbit; Pam Scheyne	Brötzmann	3:42
9.	"Get Me Some"	Tommy La Verdi; Daniel Pandher	Pandher; Ken & Jon	3:24
10.	"U Can't Stop"	Svein Finneide; Jon Rydningen; Ken Ingwersen	Ken & Jon	3:18
11.	"Tell Me Why"	Christoph Papendieck; Gary Wallis; Sven Schumacher; Shaham Joyce	Papendieck; Wallis; Schumacher	3:39
12.	"All of the Above"	Howard New; Peter Gordeno; Graham Kearns	Ries	3:17
13.	"Never Stop" (Unplugged Mix)	Klein; Herrlin; Loefgrin	Brötzmann	3:09
Total length:				47:19

== Charts ==
Weekly chart performance for Days of Our Lives
Chart (2003)	Peak position
Austrian Albums (Ö3 Austria)	37
German Albums (Offizielle Top 100)	10
Swiss Albums (Schweizer Hitparade)	39
