= Showtime (Bro'Sis album) =

Studio album by Bro'Sis
- Released: 30 August 2004
- Length: 47:34
- Label: Cheyenne; Polydor; Zeitgeist
- Producer: Fredro; Peter Hoff; Andy Love; Jos Jorgensen; Marek Pompetzki

Bro'Sis chronology
Days of Our Lives (2003)	Showtime (2004)

Showtime is the third and final studio album by German pop group Bro'Sis. It was released on 30 August 2004 by Cheyenne Records, Polydor and Zeitgeist.

== Chart performance ==
Showtime debuted and peaked at number 24 on the German Albums Chart. It became Bro'Sis's first album to miss the top ten in Germany as well as their lowest-charting album. The album would remain three weeks on the chart.

== Track listing ==
Showtime track listing
No.	Title	Writer(s)	Producer(s)	Length
1.	"Crazy Radio" (Intro)			0:29
2.	"Wiggle It"	Fredrik Ödesjö; Machel Montano	Fredro	3:40
3.	"U Build Me Up"	Blair MacKichan	Fredro	4:35
4.	"Freaky" (Intro)			0:45
5.	"Freaky Deaky"	Ödesjö; Henrik Jonback; Justin Scott; Lain Farquharson	Fredro	3:34
6.	"Crazy"	Andy Love; Jos Jorgensen; Stuart Crichton	Love; Jorgensen	2:59
7.	"Fed Up"	Shawn Dark; RedOne; Adeka Stupart	Peter Hoff	3:38
8.	"Funk U"	Faiz Mangat; Thomas Richard Klein; Stefan Lenkelt; Shaham Joyce	Fredro	3:53
9.	"Lie About Us"	Beau Dozier; Bruce Boniface	Marek Pompetzki	4:02
10.	"Make Up" (Intro)			1:12
11.	"Make Up Your Mind"	Love; Kim Sanders; Pompetzki	Pompetzki	3:12
12.	"My One And Only"	Ödesjö; Nina Woodford; Henrik Jonback; Haydon Eshun	Fredro	3:30
13.	"Freak Out"	Love; Jorgensen	Love; Jorgensen	2:53
14.	"Wanna Be Free"	Bro'Sis; Hoff	Hoff	4:05
15.	"Dirty Girl"	Arnthor Birgisson; Matt Prime	Fredro	3:57
16.	"Outro"			1:15
Total length:				47:34

== Charts ==
Weekly chart performance for Showtime
Chart (2004)	Peak position
German Albums (Offizielle Top 100)	24
