= MacKichan =

MacKichan is a surname. Notable people with the surname include:

- Blair MacKichan, English actor, musician and songwriter
- Clare MacKichan, American automotive engineer and designer and GM executive
- Doon MacKichan, English comedian
- Steve McKichan, retired Canadian ice hockey goalkeeper
