= Never Forget (Where You Come From) =

Studio album by Bro'Sis
- Released: 21 January 2002
- Length: 53:45
- Labels: Cheyenne; Polydor; Zeitgeist
- Producers: Thorsten Brötzmann; David Brunner; Alex Christensen; Toni Cottura; Island Brothers; Achim Jannsen; Marc Mozart; Mirko von Schliefen; Roland Spremberg; Syndicate

Bro'Sis chronology
Never Forget (Where You Come From) (2002)	Days of Our Lives (2003)

Never Forget (Where You Come From) is the debut studio album by German group Bro'Sis, the winners of Popstars – Du bist mein Traum (2001), the second season of the German version of the reality television series Popstars. It was released on 21 January 2002 on Cheyenne Records, Polydor and Zeitgeist. It was primarily produced by Toni Cottura, with additional production from Alex Christensen, Marc Mozart, D-Fact, Frank Lio, N-Dee, Mirko von Schliefen, Roland Spremberg, and others.

The album reached the top of the German, Austrian and Swiss Albums Chart and spawned five singles, including number-one single "I Believe" and a cover version of American boy band 98 Degrees' 1999 Christmas single "This Gift". Including its Special Winter Edition, issued on 11 November 2002, Never Forget (Where You Come From) managed to sell more than 500,000 copies domestically. With 38 weeks in the German Top 100, the album became the eleventh-most-successful album of 2002 in Germany.

== Critical reception ==
Professional ratings
Review scores
Source	Rating
laut.de	1/5 stars

Vicky Butscher from laut.de dismissed the album as "the cheapest boy band sound—nobody needs this," criticizing its "lukewarm glossy production" and lack of originality. She further described the songs as "completely overproduced, slick" and ultimately disposable, concluding that the record amounted to formulaic, short-lived pop with no innovation. Der Stern predicted the album's success, stating that "one doesn’t need to be a prophet" to know it would reach number one, given the group’s media exposure. However, the magazine the music itself as "pleasant R&B pop to hum along to," noting that the songs offered little surprise despite their commercial appeal.

== Commercial performance ==
Never Forget (Where You Come From) achieved strong commercial success across German-speaking Europe upon its release in 2002. In Austria, the album debuted at number one on the Austrian Albums Chart and went on to secure the 17th position on the year-end chart. It was subsequently certified gold by the Austrian arm of the International Federation of the Phonographic Industry (IFPI), denoting shipments of 20,000 units. In Germany, the album likewise reached number one on the German Albums Chart and demonstrated sustained commercial performance, finishing at number 11 on the year-end chart. It received a double platinum certification from the Bundesverband Musikindustrie (BVMI), indicating shipments of 600,000 units.

== Track listing ==
Never Forget (Where You Come From) – Standard edition
No.	Title	Writer(s)	Producer(s)	Length
1.	"I Believe"	Alex Christensen; Jens Klein; Peter Könemann	Christensen	3:27
2.	"Just the 2 of Us"	David Brunner; Kaynee Tracks; Sebastian Kirchner; Toni Works	Brunner	3:26
3.	"All I Wanna Know"	Christoph Brüx; Shahin Moshirian; Stephan Browarczyk; Toni Cottura	Cottura	3:16
4.	"We'll Put a Spell on You"	Kim Sanders; Marcus Brosch; Roland Spremberg	Island Brothers; Spremberg	3:25
5.	"Walkin' with You"	Andy Love; Giorgio Koppehele; Marc Z; Martin Koppehele; Sven Zippmann	Koppehele; John Eaton; Marc Z; Koppehele	4:21
6.	"Do You"	Arkadius Raschka; Ingo Hugenroth; Patricia Bernetti; Cottura	Cottura	3:09
7.	"Gimme Some Lovin'"	Moshirian; Browarczyk; Cottura	Cottura	3:48
8.	"Bounce"	Achim Jannsen; Hermann Behrens; M. Carlson; Mirko von Schlieffen; N. Lautarevic; O. Ullmann; Terri Bjerre	Achim Jannsen; von Schlieffen	4:03
9.	"Heaven Must Be Missing an Angel"	Dane Deviller; Sean Hossein; Supaflyas	D-Fact; Frank Lio; N-Dee	3:48
10.	"What's Goin' On"	Aleks Jovanovic; Emanuell Twellmann; Frank W. Dursthoff; June Rollocks	Christensen	3:42
11.	"Ain't That the Way"	Christoph Papendieck; Fontaine Brunett; Gerret Frerichs; Pascal F.E.O.S.	Papendieck; Frerichs; F.E.O.S.	4:28
12.	"Who's Been Sleeping in My Bed"	D-Fact; Frank Lio; N-Dee; Rofl Gagel; Dash Andrews	D-Fact; Frank Lio; N-Dee	3:06
13.	"You Better Not Come Home"	D-Fact; Frank Lio; N-Dee; Gagel; Andrews; Daniela Burghardt; Luca Barro	D-Fact; Frank Lio; N-Dee; Wolfgang Heichele	3:23
14.	"Let Me Know"	Brüx; Moshirian; Browarczyk; Cottura	Cottura	3:41
15.	"A Day in November"	Alex Geringas; Christoph Leis-Bendorff; Thorsten Brötzmann	Brötzmann; Leis-Bendorff	2:12

Never Forget (Where You Come From) – Special winter edition
No.	Title	Writer(s)	Producer(s)	Length
1.	"I Believe"	Alex Christensen; Jens Klein; Peter Könemann	Christensen	3:29
2.	"Hot Temptation"	Douglas Carr; Christian Waltz	Axel Breitung	3:21
3.	"In the Cradle"	Harry Chapin; Sandra Chapin	Marc Mozart; John Eaton	3:01
4.	"Peace of Soul"	Bro'Sis	Mozart; Eaton; Artemis Gounaki; Bro'Sis	3:01
5.	"Do You"	Raschka; Hugenroth; Bernetti; Cottura	Cottura	3:09
6.	"Just the 2 of Us"	Brunner; Tracks; Kirchner; Works	Brunner	3:26
7.	"All I Wanna Know"	Brüx; Moshirian; Browarczyk; Cottura	Cottura	3:16
8.	"This Is Too Good To Be True"	Bro'Sis; David Michael Johnson; Bernie Blanks	Mozart; Eaton	3:16
9.	"Walkin' with You"	Love; Koppehele; Marc Z; Koppehele; Zippmann	Koppehele; Eaton; Marc Z; Koppehele	4:21
10.	"Gimme Some Lovin'"	Moshirian; Browarczyk; Cottura	Cottura	3:48
11.	"Bounce"	Jannsen; Behrens; Carlson; von Schlieffen; Lautarevic; Ullmann; Bjerre	Jannsen; von Schlieffen	4:03
12.	"Heaven Must Be Missing an Angel"	Deviller; Hossein; Supaflyas	D-Fact; Frank Lio; N-Dee	3:48
13.	"Who's Been Sleeping in My Bed"	D-Fact; Lio; N-Dee; Gagel; Andrews	D-Fact; Lio; N-Dee	3:06
14.	"You Better Not Come Home"	D-Fact; Lio; N-Dee; Gagel; Andrews; Burghardt; Barro	D-Fact; Lio; N-Dee; Heichele	3:23
15.	"A Day in November"	Geringas; Leis-Bendorff; Brötzmann	Brötzmann; Leis-Bendorff	2:12
16.	"The Gift"	Anders Bagge; Arnthor Birgisson; Deviller; Hosein	Peter Ries	4:07

== Credits and personnel ==
Performers and musicians

- Jörn Heilblut – acoustic guitar
- W. Kerscheck – conductor
- J. Klein – keyboards
- P. Könemann – keyboards
- Jürgen Leydel – guitars
- Mirko Schaffer – bass

Technical

- Terri Bjerre – vocal arrangement
- Boogieman – mixing engineer
- David Brunner – mixing engineer, producer
- Broschi – mixing engineer
- Island Brothers – producer
- Alex Christensen – producer
- Toni Cottura – producer
- D.Fact – producer
- John Eaton – producer
- Joachim Feske – assistant engineer
- Gerret Frerichs – producer
- Florian Grummes – vocal recording
- Achim Jannsen – producer
- Koma – mixing engineer
- Giorgio Koppele – producer
- Martin Koppehele – producer
- Christoph Leis-Bendorff – mixing engineer
- Frank Lio – producer
- Marc Mozart – producer
- N-Dee – producer
- Christoph Papendieck – producer
- Pascal F.E.O.S. – producer
- Quickmix – mixing engineer
- Andi Regler – mixing engineer
- Rollo – mixing engineer
- Mirko von Schlieffen – producer
- Roland Spremberg – producer
- Jürgen Wind – mixing engineer

== Charts ==
=== Weekly charts ===
Weekly chart performance for Never Forget (Where You Come From)
Chart (2002)	Peak position
Austrian Albums (Ö3 Austria)	1
German Albums (Offizielle Top 100)	1
Swiss Albums (Schweizer Hitparade)	6

=== Year-end charts ===
Year-end chart performance for Never Forget (Where You Come From)
Chart (2002)	Position
Austrian Albums (Ö3 Austria)	17
German Albums (Offizielle Top 100)	11

== Certifications ==
Certifications for Never Forget (Where You Come From)
Region	Certification	Certified units/sales
Austria (IFPI Austria)	Gold	20,000^{*}
Germany (BVMI)	2× Platinum	600,000^{^}
Switzerland (IFPI Switzerland)	Gold	20,000^{^}
^{*} Sales figures based on certification alone.^{^} Shipments figures based on certification alone.
