= Bro'Sis =

German pop group (2001–2005)

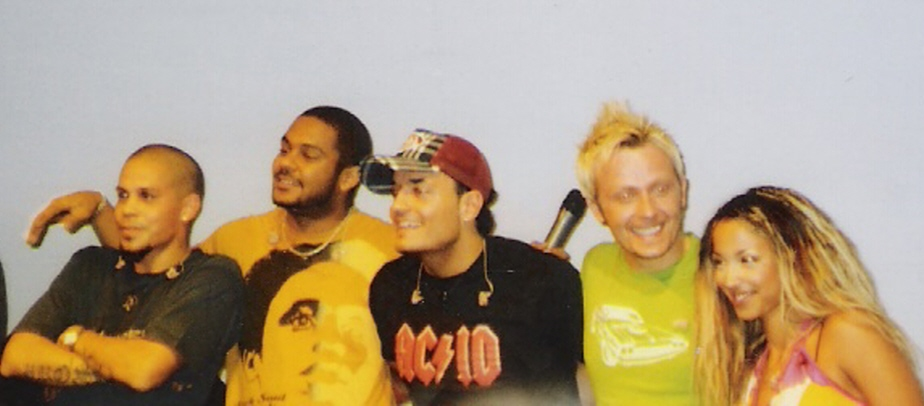
- Bro'Sis in 2004 (L-R: Shaham Joyce, Faiz Mangat, Giovanni Zarrella, Ross Antony, Hila Bronstein)

Background information
- Origin: Germany
- Genres: Pop; R&B; hip hop
- Years active: 2001–2005
- Labels: Cheyenne; Polydor; Zeitgeist
- Members: Ross Antony; Hila Bronstein; Shaham Joyce; Faiz Mangat; Indira Weis (2001–2003); Giovanni Zarrella

Bro'Sis was an R&B/pop group from Germany, which was formed through the TV series Popstars – Du bist mein Traum in 2001. The group comprised the singers Ross Antony, Hila Bronstein, Shaham Joyce, Faiz Mangat, Indira Weis, and Giovanni Zarrella. The sextet achieved major success with hit singles "I Believe", "Do You", "Heaven Must Be Missing an Angel", "Hot Temptation", and their first album Never Forget (Where You Come From) (2002).

Weis's departure from the group preceded the release of their second studio album, Days of Our Lives (2002), which contains singles "Oh No"/"Never Stop" and "V.I.P." In 2004, the remaining members released their third and final album, Showtime. Commercially less successful, it led to their departure from Cheyenne Records and internal conflicts within the group.

In 2005, the band announced a minor hiatus that was later revealed to be an official break-up. Bro'Sis became one of the few reality television winners and Popstars acts to achieve continued success. The band has sold 4 million records, making them one of the biggest-selling German groups.

== History ==
=== Formation ===
In summer 2001, the German version of Popstars returned with a second installment of the series on the RTL II network, this time searching for a mixed-gender musical group. More than 11,000 budding singers attended open television auditions in Frankfurt, Cologne, Berlin, Stuttgart, Hamburg and Munich, conducted by choreographer Detlef "D!" Soost, producer Alex Christensen, and singer and radio host Noah Sow. Over the course of several recalls and re-recalls, the three judges and vocal coach Artemis Gounaki reduced the contestants to a group of 32. The singers then travelled to Ibiza, Spain to receive training in singing, dancing, and fitness. In the end, three females and five males remained who again moved into a loft in Munich to start working on their performance and publicity skills.

During a special episode on 11 November 2001, judges Soost and Christensen eventually disclosed that Ross Antony, Hila Bronstein, Shaham Joyce, Faiz Mangat, Indira Weis, and Giovanni Zarrella had been chosen to become part of the group, which was subsequently named Bro'Sis.

=== 2001–2002: "I Believe" and Never Forget ===
On 10 December 2001, Bro'Sis released their Alex Christensen–produced debut single "I Believe" in Germany, Austria, and Switzerland. The hip hop-influenced pop song debuted at number-one in all three nations, having sold approximately 800,000 copies within its first week of release, beating previous Popstars winners No Angels' first week success of their debut single "Daylight in Your Eyes". While "I Believe" remained another three weeks atop the German Singles Chart, it went triple platinum in Germany, and was certified platinum in Austria and Switzerland, respectively. Altogether, the single sold around 1.5 million copies, making it one of the biggest-selling singles ever in Germany.

Cheyenne Record consulted Toni Cottura, Thorsten Brötzmann, Marcus Brosch, and Marc Mozart to work with the group on their debut hip hop and R&B influenced debut album. Released in January 2002, Never Forget (Where You Come From) reached number one in Austria and Germany and peaked at number six on the Swiss Singles Chart. Reaching sales in excess of more than 450,000 units, the album became the eleventh biggest-selling album of the year in Germany. Due to the sheer volume of interest, Never Forget spawned another two top ten hits with "Do You" and "Heaven Must Be Missing An Angel". In the meantime, Bro'Sis finished a short club tour and appeared as a supporting act on O-Town's blitz tour.

In May 2002, Bro'Sis embarked on the Never Forget Tour. Compiling more than twenty dates, the tour concluded the following month. In October 2002, the band released the previously unreleased single "Hot Temptation", their fourth consecutive top ten hit. The following month, a Special Winter Edition reissue of the Never Forget was released, including their next single, the Christmas song "The Gift", a cover version of the 98 Degrees single. It reached number 16 on the German Singles Chart but failed to chart in Switzerland.

=== 2003: Days of Our Lives and Weis's departure ===
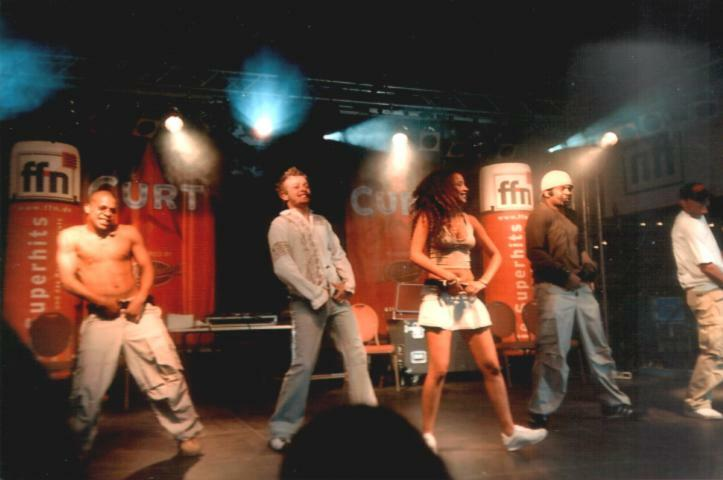
Bro'Sis performing in Hanover in August 2003

In April 2003, Bro'Sis released the double A-side lead single from their second studio album, consisting of latin pop-influenced "Oh No" and the promotional German Football Association hymn "Never Stop". The single became the band's fifth top ten entry in Germany. On 9 May 2003, four days before the release of parent album Days of Our Lives, Weis announced her departure from the group. Official statements claimed that musical differences between her and the rest of the band had been the reason for leaving, with Weis expressing her displeasure about the increasing urban elements in their music. However, Antony later confirmed that she had fallen out with her bandmates.

Upon release, Days of our Lives debuted and peaked at number 10 on the German Albums Chart and reached the top 30 in Austria and Switzerland. A new version of album cut "V.I.P.", excluding Weis's vocals, was released as the album's second and final single and peaked at a moderate number 19 on the German Singles Chart in June 2004.

After a longer hiatus, Bro'Sis participated in the TV Allstars Christmas charity project in November 2003. Combining several bands and contestants from the German adaptations of Popstars and Star Search, a re-recording of the Band Aid's hit single "Do They Know It's Christmas?" was released as a single and became a top three hit in Germany. Bro'Sis also recorded a cover version of "White Christmas" for the accompanying The Ultimate Christmas Album, which was certified gold by the BVMI. Afterwards, the band teamed up with Popstars successors Overground and Preluders to tour throughout several German cities again.

=== 2004: Showtime and break-up ===
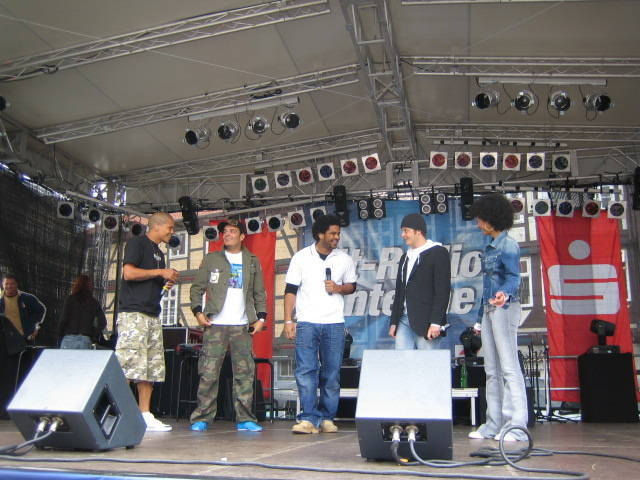
Bro'Sis performing in Celle during their last concert (2005)

In March 2004, all three bands collaborated on a promotional remake of "With a Little Help from My Friends" for the 2004 Red Nose Day. The same month, Bro'Sis released "U Build Me Up", the first single from their third studio album Showtime. It became the group's eighth consecutive top twenty entry on the German Singles Chart but was less successful than previous lead singles. The band took a bigger role in writing and recording Showtime, which saw them working with several new producers and songwriters, including Fredrik "Fredro" Ödesjö, Blair MacKichan and Marek Pompetzki. Released in August 2004, it underperformed commercially when it failed to chart in Austria and Switzerland and peaked at number 24 on the German Albums Chart, resulting in lackluster sales in general and the release of no further physical singles.

Amid ongoing internal conflicts within the group due to the emphasis on Bronstein, the group's sole female vocalist, the subordinate treatment of the other members, and declining commercial success, Bro'Sis's recording contract with Cheyenne Records expired in fall 2004 and was not renewed. In mid–2005, the group announced a minor hiatus that was later revealed to be an official break-up when meetings discussing future projects failed to materialize in January 2006.

== Discography ==
Studio albums

- Never Forget (Where You Come From) (2002)
- Days of Our Lives (2003)
- Showtime (2004)
