= Detlef Soost =

German television personality, dancer and choreographer

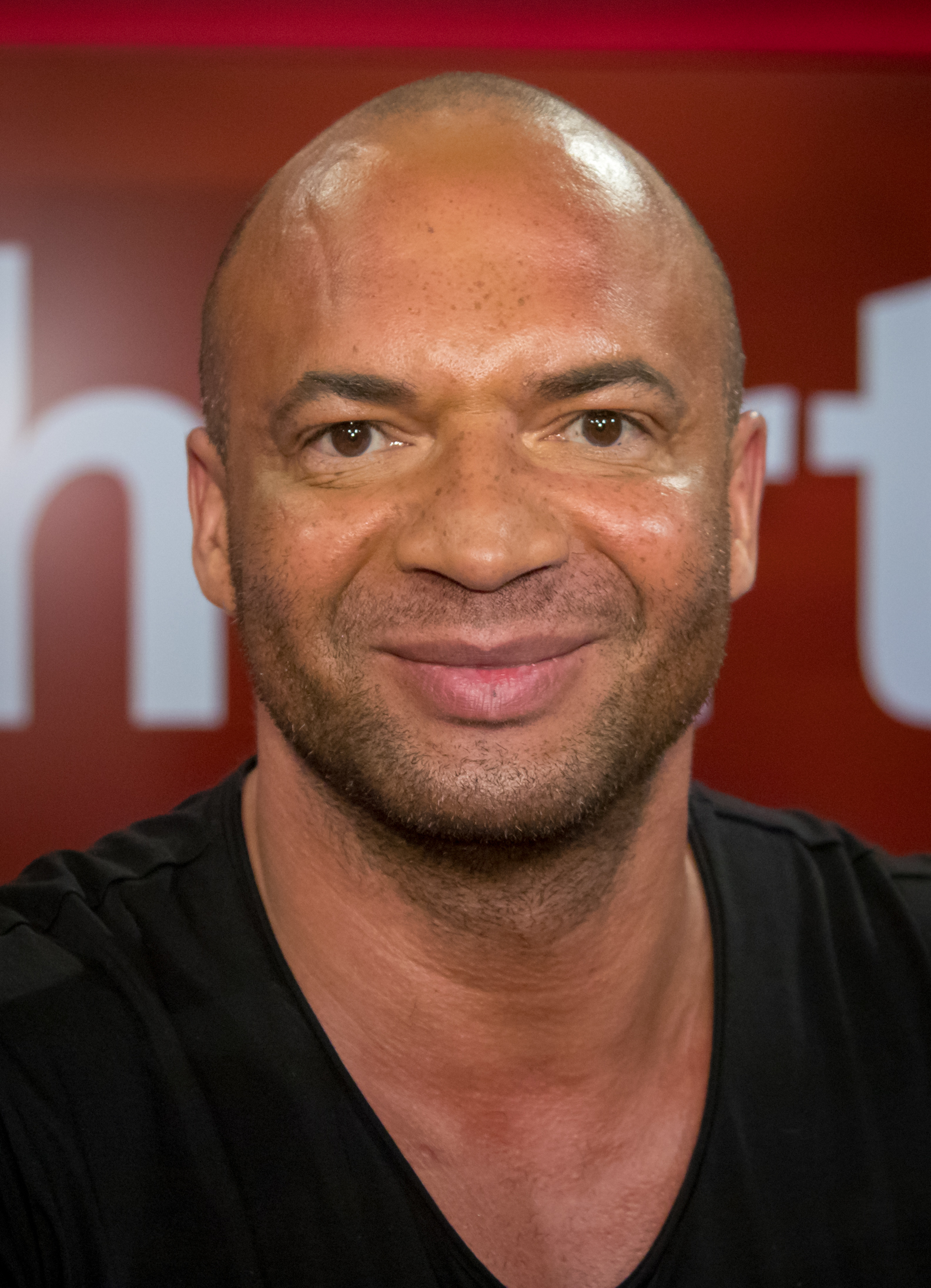
Soost in 2018

Detlef Soost (born 2 July 1970), also using the name D! (formerly Dee!), most often called Detlef D! Soost, is a German television personality, dancer and choreographer who gained recognition as one of the jury members of the German talent show Popstars.

== Early life ==
Soost was born East Berlin, East Germany, and grew up in an orphanage. His mother, who died very early, was a German, and his father came to East Germany from Ghana.

According to the biography on his homepage, Soost became streetdance champion of East Berlin when he was 15 years old, and champion of East Germany when he was 16, but some critics point out that, based on his date of birth given in the same biography, this appears very unrealistic, as streetdance was not accepted in East Germany and no "official" battles could be held in which Soost could have won a title. However, there is no doubt that Soost in this time was one of the most important people in (East) Berlin's streetdance scene.

== Career ==
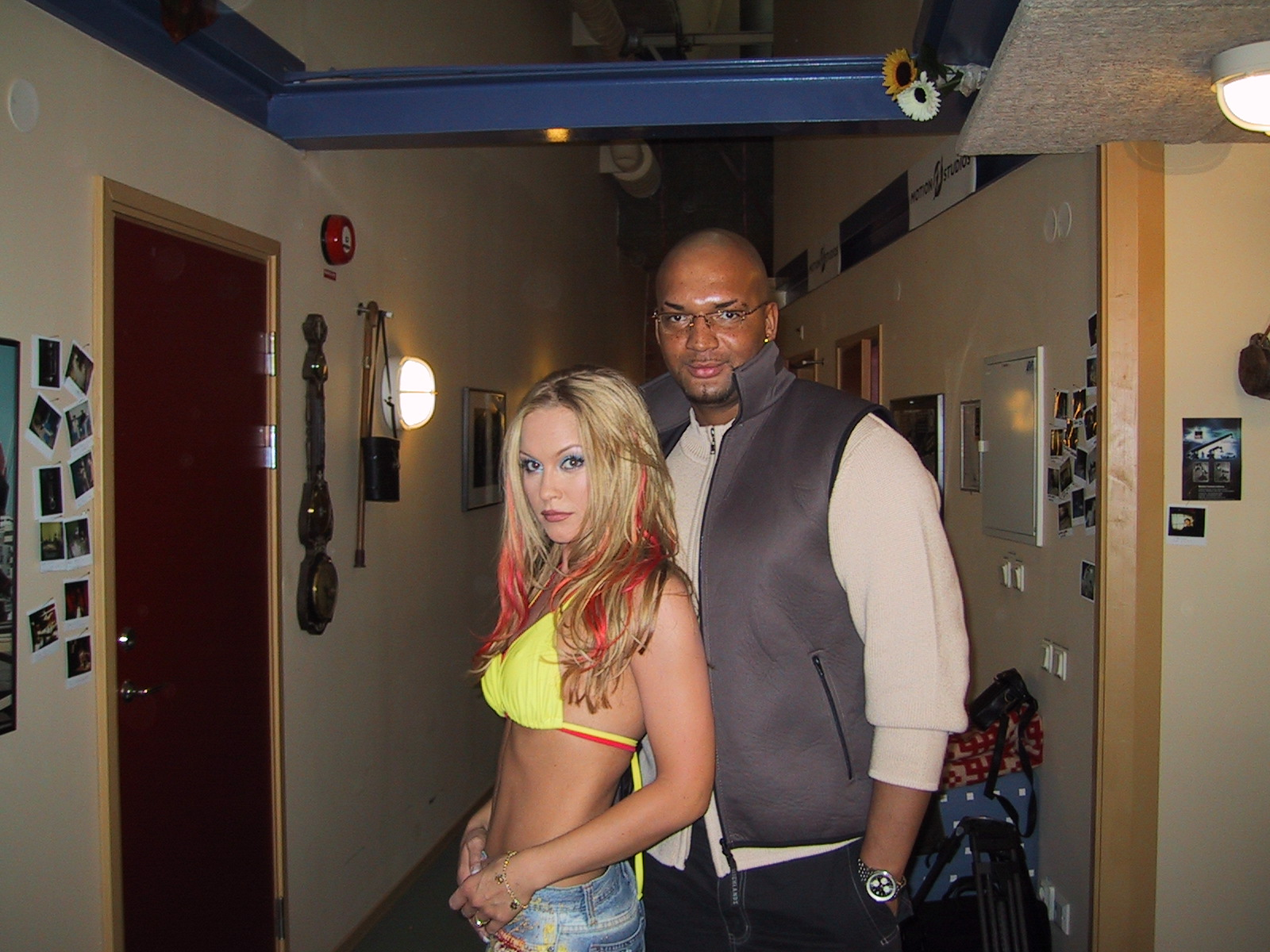
Soost in the early 2000s

In 2005, Soost published his autobiography Neger – Heimkind – Pionier ("Negro – Orphan – Pioneer"). In this book, among other things, he also writes about his ethnic background and the problems caused by it. Soost describes himself as "Schoki", a childish word for chocolate. In the years after the German reunification, he started a career as a professional choreographer and dance teacher. Later, he founded a network of dancing schools under the brand D!s Dance Club. He owns a "Coaching and Casting Center" in Berlin-Mitte. He also produces dance music and develops choreographies for the "D!s Dance Clubs" and other dancers under the brand D!Nation.

=== Television ===
Soost was the choreographer and head of jury in every season of the German version of Popstars, broadcast by ProSieben. He also presents a similar program called MusicStar on Swiss SF DRS. In 2005, he presented Super Illu TV on MDR. In 2005/06, Soost also worked for ProSieben, presenting Lebe Dein Leben! – Live-Coaching mit Detlef D! Soost, before the show got canceled due to TV ratings. On the German music television channel VIVA, Soost hosted, presented and led all four seasons (2005–2008) of the casting show DanceStar.

Soost also took part in the ProSieben reality show Die Alm – Promischweiß und Edelweiß in 2004, a show in which several lesser known German celebrities had to live and work on an "alm" in the Alps, and the audience could vote for a winner. After the regular run of the show, Soost was close to winning, but had to leave the show when it was extended, because of other projects. In 2007, he won the German version of the Gameshow Marathon on ProSieben.

== Personal life ==
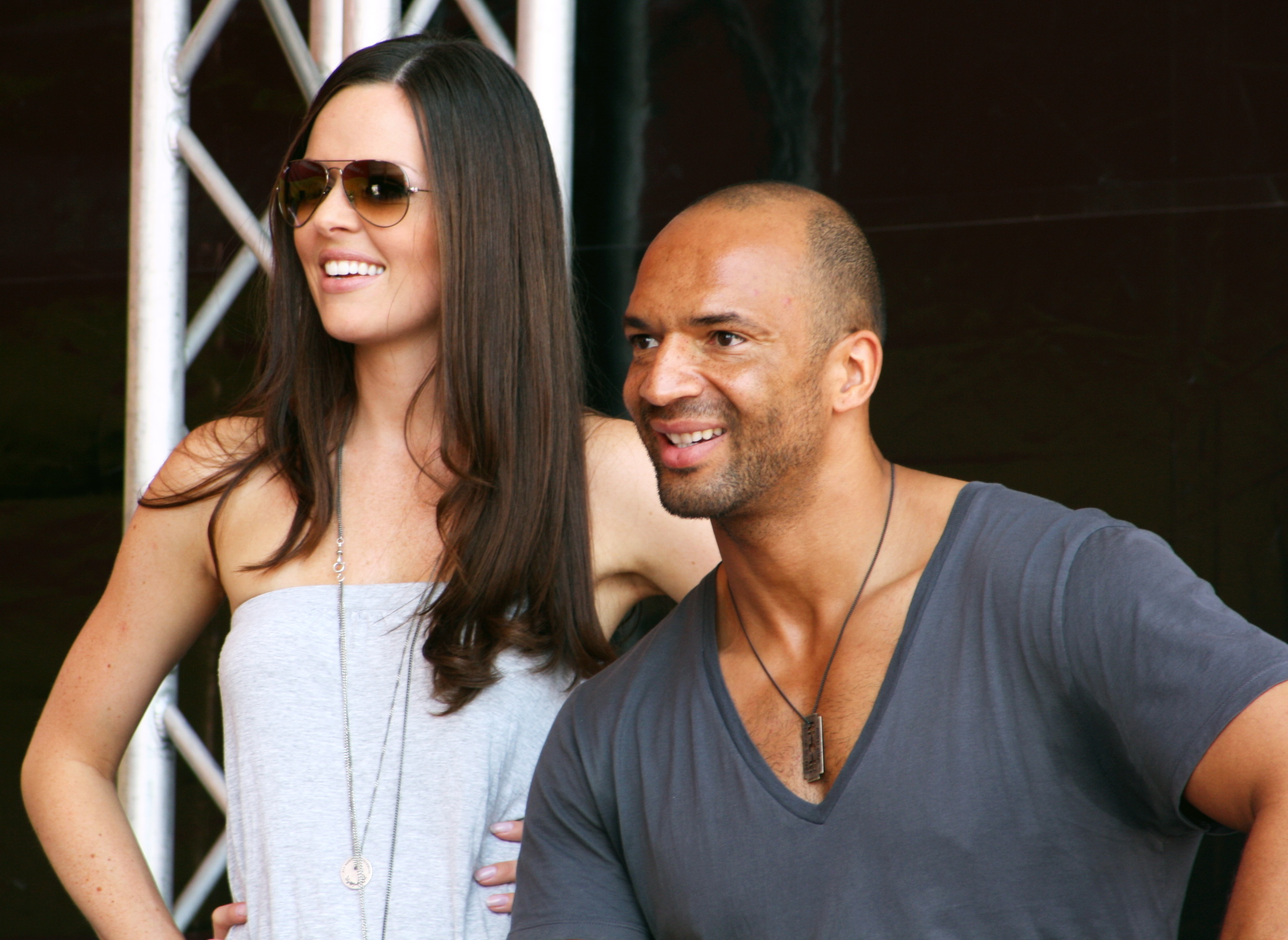
Soost and his wife Kate Hall in 2010

Soost has two children from an earlier relationship; daughter Chani, who was born in April 2006, and son Carlos, born in July 2007. Since 2009, he has been married to British singer Kate Hall.
