= Indira Weis =

German singer and actress (born 1979)

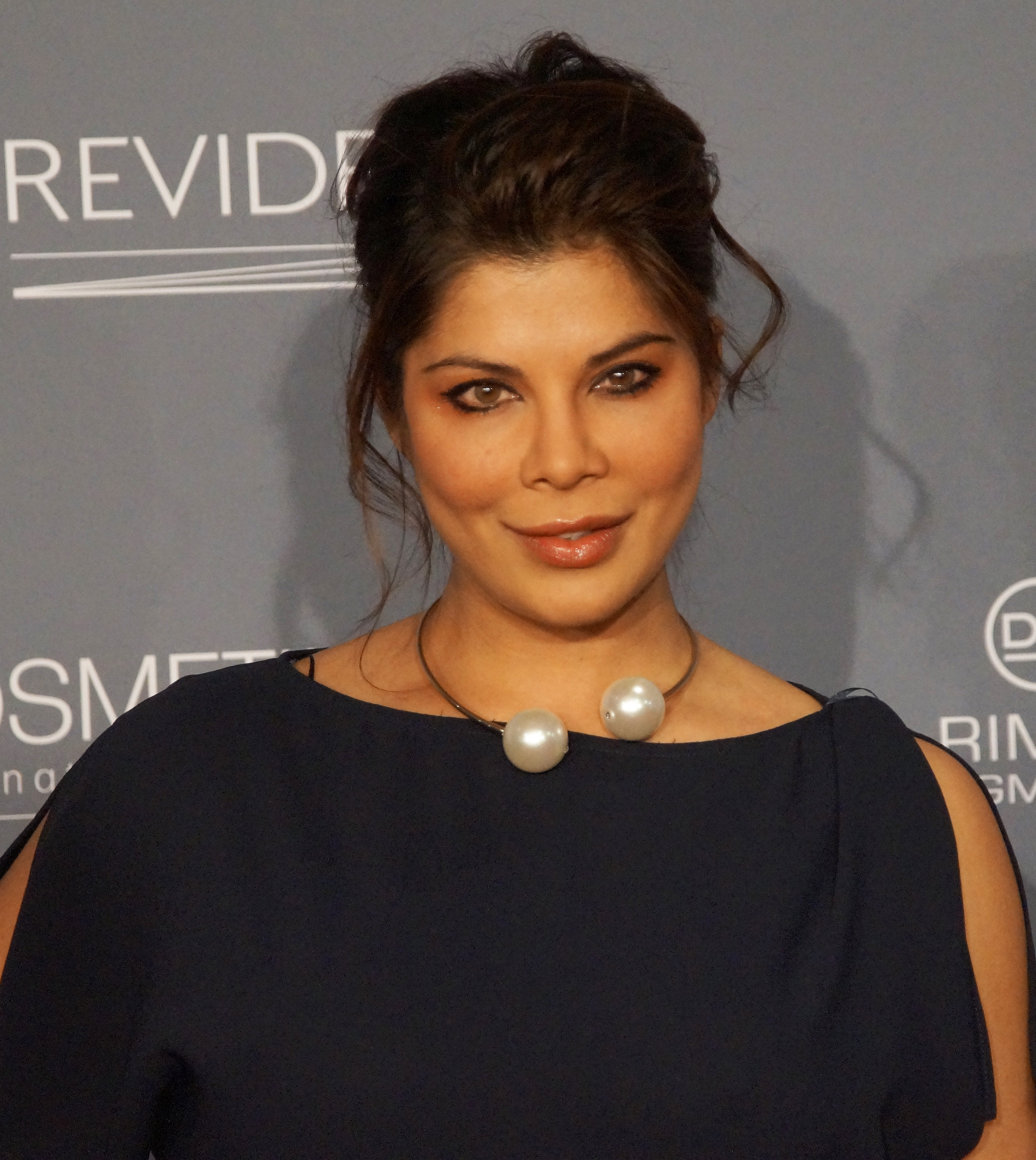
- Weis in 2016

Background information
- Born: Verena Weis; 30 September 1979 (age 47); Groß-Gerau, West Germany
- Genre: R&B / pop
- Occupations: Singer, actress
- Years active: 2001–present
- Formerly of: Bro'Sis
- Website: indiraweis.de

Indira Weis (born Verena Weis; 30 September 1979) is a German singer and actress who rose to fame as a member of the R&B/Pop group Bro'Sis.

== Biography ==
=== Early life ===
Weis was born the second daughter to Manju, an Indian interpreter and her German-Jewish father Helmut, a retired grammar school teacher. Her father's ancestors were Hungarian Jews who had converted to Christianity to avoid being socially marginalized. Her one-year older sister works as a flight attendant. Weis received the nickname "Indira" on a trip to India where she has relatives.

At the age of five, Weis started taking piano and guitar lessons. After finishing school and a short period of studying music sciences and American studies, Weis started taking theatrical lessons in a theatre school in Munich. There, she helped in a hip hop tape and started to work as a model. She left theatre school after one year and finished a training period in an internet agency. Before her application for Popstars, she worked as a producer for Frankfurt radio station Planet Radio.

After spending over a year in Israel, Weiss converted to Orthodox Judaism. Her Hebrew name is Shira, meaning "singing" in Hebrew.

=== Bro'Sis ===
In 2001, Weis auditioned for the second season of the German reality TV series Popstars. The judges Alex Christensen, Noah Sow and Detlef Soost were impressed with her performance of Usher's song "You Make Me Wanna". Weis earned a spot in the "recall" and "re-recall" (second and third round, respectively), and subsequently made it to the final eight of the show. During a special episode in November 2001, jury member Soost disclosed that Weis was chosen to become part of the final group, later named Bro'Sis.

With the final six members of the band in place, Popstars continued tracking the development and struggles of Bro'Sis. However, it took another two months until the band released "I Believe", produced by Christensen, which would subsequently appear on the band's debut album Never Forget (Where You Come From). The single and the album became a major success, both peaking at No. 1 on the German and Austrian singles, airplay and albums charts, eventually selling more than 1.5 million copies.

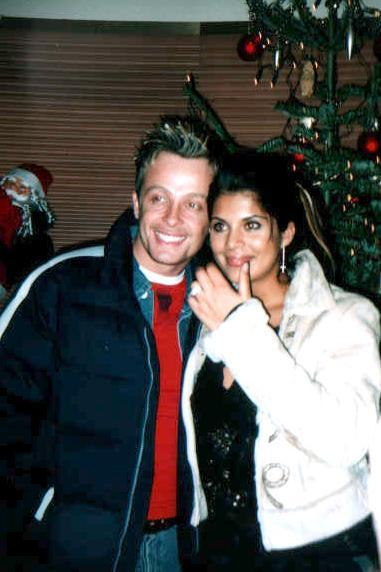
Weis (right) with her Bro'Sis bandmate Ross Antony in December 2002

In the following years, the hype around the band decreased. On 9 May 2003, four days before the band's second album's release, Weis announced her departure from the Bro'Sis. Official statements claimed that musical differences between her and the rest of the group had been reason enough for leaving. However, rumours persisted that she had fallen out with her bandmates.

=== Solo career ===
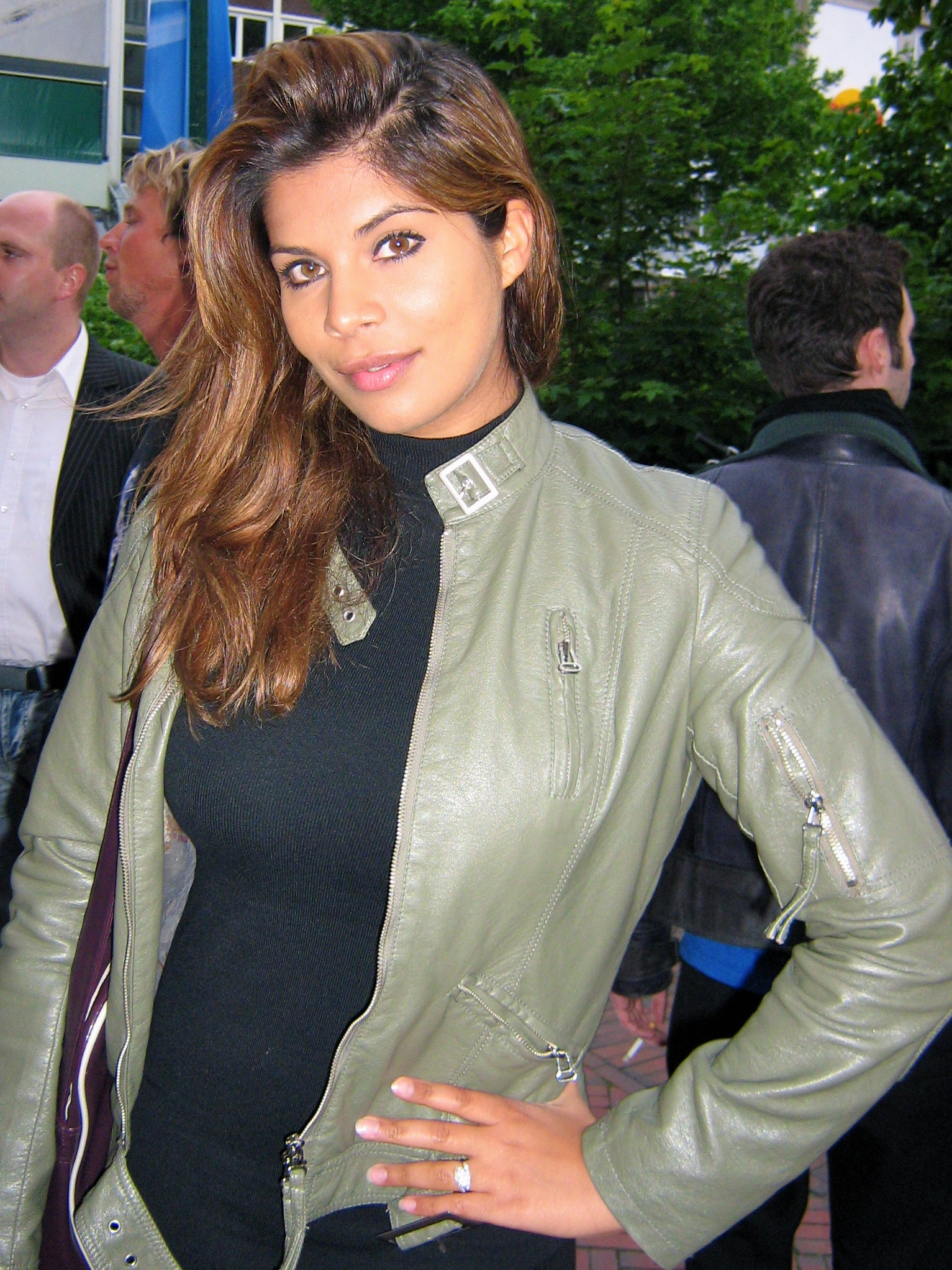
Weis in 2010

After going solo, Weis focused on her acting career. In September 2009, she released her debut single, a cover version of the Rudi Carrell single "Wann wird's mal wieder richtig Sommer?". She recorded a video for her second single, "Oh", also in September 2009, but the plans to release the video were dropped. Against her will, the video premiered in its entirety on YouTube on 6 November 2009 and received harsh criticism.

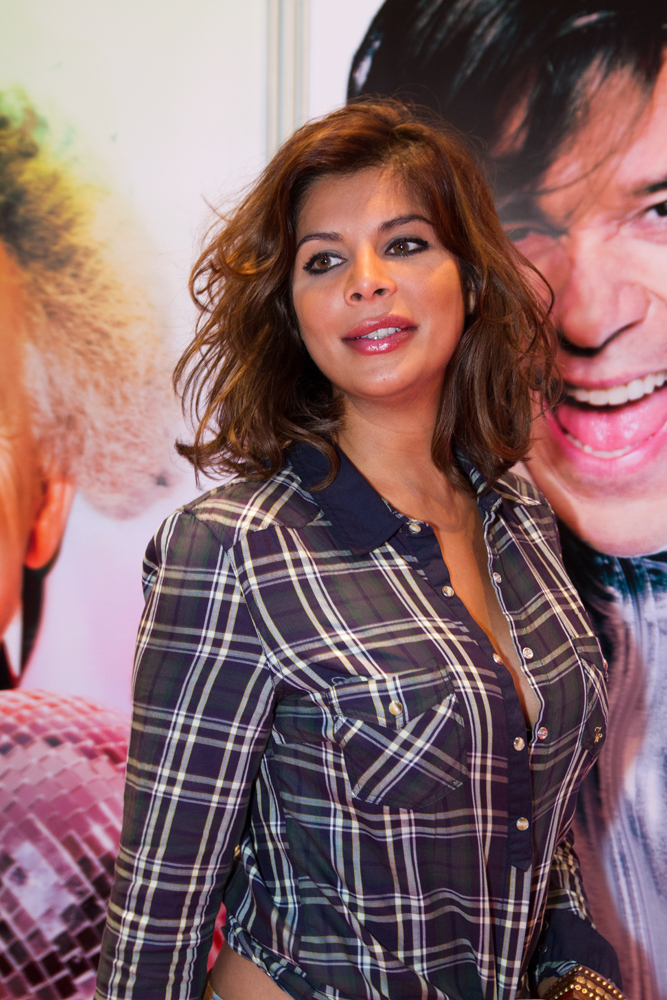
Weis in 2011

On 25 June 2010, Weis released her second single, "Beautiful Destination".

== Discography ==
=== Solo singles ===
Year	Single
2009	"Wann wird's mal wieder richtig Sommer?"
2010	"Beautiful Destination"
2011	"Hol de Radio"

== Film and television ==
- 2004: Cologne P.D. (ZDF)
- 2005: Letztes Kapitel (ZDF)
- 2005: SOKO Kitzbühel – Blumen für die Diva (ZDF)
- 2007: Der Kriminalist – Abwärts (ZDF)
- 2008: Das Traumhotel – Karibik (ARD)
- 2008: Arbeitsaufenthalt in Israel
- 2011: Ich bin ein Star – Holt mich hier raus! (season 5)

=== Films ===
- 2005: Helloh
- 2007: Miss Lucifer!
- 2010: Snowblind

== Theater ==
- 1993: Igelhans, Mannheim National Theatre
- 1995: The Winter's Tale, Staatstheater Darmstadt
- 1998: West Side Story (as Maria), Manchester
- 2005: Quo Vadis, Trier

== Awards ==
- 2002: New Face Award (fashion trendsetter)
