= Popstars (German TV series) =

German reality television series

- Genre: Reality competition
- Created by: Jonathan Dowling
- Based on: Popstars
- Opening theme: Various
- Country of origin: Germany
- No. of seasons: 11

Production
- Running time: 60–100 minutes
- Production companies: Tresor TV (2000–2011); Brainpool TV (2015)

Original release
- Network: RTL II (2000–2001; 2015); ProSieben (2003–2012)
- Release: 14 November 2000 – 10 October 2015

Popstars is a German reality television series that aired for 11 seasons between 2000 and 2015. An adaptation of the international Popstars franchise, which originated in New Zealand in 1999, it was among the earliest casting show formats to become established in German-speaking Europe and developed into one of Germany's most prominent music-oriented reality programmes of the 2000s. The series was produced primarily by Tresor TV and originally broadcast on RTL II. From its third season, the series moved to ProSieben, where it remained for almost a decade with several interruptions. It returned to RTL II for its eleventh season in 2015, produced by Brainpool TV.

The series followed the formation of pop groups through a combination of auditions, workshops, training and performances, with the format and selection process evolving considerably from season to season. Across its run, Popstars launched a number of commercially successful acts, including No Angels, Bro'Sis, Overground, Preluders, Nu Pagadi, Monrose, Room 2012, Queensberry, Some & Any, LaViVe, Melouria, and Leandah. The format evolved considerably over its run. Initially conceived as a largely documentary-style programme following the creation of a new group, later seasons incorporated increasingly competitive and performance-based elements associated with other talent show formats, including Idol spin-off Deutschland sucht den Superstar, The X Factor, and The Voice.

Popstars also served as a significant platform for launching the careers of performers who went on to achieve mainstream success. In the programme's early years, groups formed through the series enjoyed considerable commercial success, with several reaching the top of the charts and setting sales records. As the show's ratings declined in its later years, however, the commercial impact and longevity of its winning acts generally diminished. The eleventh season, Popstars 2015, broadcast in 2015, was the final German edition of the franchise. By then, the German adaptation had been produced for longer than any other international edition of the format. The programme has subsequently been described in German media as the "mother of all casting shows."

== Background ==
Popstars originated in New Zealand, broadcast on TV2 in 1999, where producer Jonathan Dowling formed the five member all-girl group TrueBliss. Dowling subsequently licensed the format to the Australian production company Screentime, which produced an Australian adaptation that resulted in the formation of the girl group Bardot. Both productions achieved high television ratings and rapid commercial success, particularly through the record sales of the groups they created. In April 2000, while the Australian adaptation was still being broadcast, Holger Roost-Macias, then managing director of television production company Tresor TV, was offered the rights to the format by a British licensing agent at the MIPTV Media Market in Cannes. Roost-Macias subsequently developed the German adaptation of the format with Tresor TV and the RTL Group network RTL II, which broadcast the first two seasons in Germany.

In Germany, the format was conceived not only as a television programme but also as a broader commercial venture built around the groups it produced. Tresor TV and RTL II shared equally in the revenues generated through merchandising, sponsorship, and the music-related exploitation of the groups formed during its first two seasons, No Angels and Bro'Sis. Tresor's subsidiary, the Cheyenne Media Group, oversaw much of the groups' commercial activities, including A&R, music publishing and production, as well as public relations and brand management, while its label Cheyenne Records served as their official record label. Polydor acted primarily as a distribution partner on a project-by-project basis, while maintaining a partnership with the companies involved in the production and television exploitation of the group. RTL II, meanwhile, continued to promote the group through television coverage, including reports, helping to maintain public interest in the group and its associated products.

Following two successful seasons on RTL II, the format moved to ProSieben in 2003. Although RTL II had planned to continue the series, Tresor TV developed a revised concept for the third season, inspired by the British Popstars: The Rivals format, in which a boy band and a girl group were formed in parallel and competed against each other for victory. ProSieben subsequently acquired the revised format and launched it as Popstars – Das Duell. In 2005, the ProSiebenSat.1 entered into a joint venture with Warner Music Germany to establish Starwatch Music, allowing the group to take a more direct role in the marketing and commercial exploitation of artists emerging from the format. Starwatch subsequently became involved in the release and distribution of Popstars acts alongside Cheyenne Records, which continued to operate as a label and commercial partner.

Following its tenth season in 2012, Popstars went on hiatus after declining ratings on ProSieben. Later that year, the German format rights reverted from Tresor TV to the Australian rights holder Screentime. In 2013, the rights were transferred within the Banijay Group to Brainpool TV, which subsequently developed plans to revive the format. In 2015, Brainpool partnered with RTL II on a revival of the series, with RTL II returning as its broadcaster and bringing Popstars back to the network where the German adaptation had originally premiered in 2000. The Universal Music Group was involved in the musical production and distribution of the resulting group, Leandah. The revival was poorly received, with declining ratings prompting RTL II to move the remaining episodes out of primetime. Brainpool did not produce another season, making the 2015 revival the final German edition of the series.

== Overview ==
The series follows a group of aspiring singers aged 16 or older as they go through an audition process to join a pop group. The contestants, who also live together during the course of the series, are judged on their vocal and dancing ability. Outside of stage performances, the contestants experience choreography and song recording.

First-season winners No Angels (Sandy Mölling, Lucy Diakovska, Nadja Benaissa, Jessica Wahls and Vanessa Petruo) were set to be the new Spice Girls.

Second-season winners Bro'Sis (Hila Bronstein, Faiz Mangat, Ross Antony, Shaham Joyce, Giovanni Zarrella and Indira Weis) were meant to be more edgy than their predecessors. That season both sexes were allowed to participate in the competition.

Third-season winners Overground (Ahmet "Akay" Kayed, Ken Miyao, Marq Porciuncula and Meiko Reißmann) won over girl group Preluders that season after a boys vs. girls battle depending on record sales and telephone votes during a big live finale.

Fourth-season winners Nu Pagadi (Markus Grimm, Patrick Boinet, Kristina Dörfer and Doreen Steinert) were titled as the best group created by this format by the judges when they had been in the pre-making statues. However, they landed some hits, but disbanded shortly after the show due to arguments between the group members. Presented as being the last group to be created by this format, they were pushed in a glam rock–rock direction in a very early statues of the show.

Fifth-season winners Monrose (Senna Gammour, Bahar Kızıl and Mandy Capristo) were created with the aim to find the new angels in addition to No Angels and to find the best voices. Consisting of only three members they were considered edgy, strong, and diverse.

Sixth-season winners Room 2012 (Cristobal Galvez Moreno, Sascha Schmitz, Julian Kasprzik and Tialda van Slogteren) were set to be the hottest live act in Germany. The group went on a tour directly after the show. This time the colour of the voice was less important than the ability to sing live in concert and get the keys. Dancers were also cast to support the final group in making a good live-show.

Seventh-season winners Queensberry (Leonore Bartsch, Victoria Ulbrich, Gabriella De Almeida Rinne and Antonella Trapani) were created with the aim to find Germany's next girl group consisting of four members. in contrast to season 5, the performance played an important rule again.

An eight season was planned for 2009 under the motto "Duo". The live semi-final on 8 December consisted of three duos. One was set to be eliminated, but the host announced that the audience could vote for their favorite duo until the final. The audience responded with heavy boos. The Final on 10 December was won by 18-year-old Vanessa Meisinger and the Brazilian-Swiss 20-year-old Leonardo (Leo) Ritzmann, later known as Some & Any.

The only judge on the show to be at least on every season is Detlef Soost, Germany's most famous choreographer.

There are some connections to its sister show Germany's Next Topmodel as the winning bands from the show performed on the live finale of Heidi Klum's model show during the models running the catwalk.

== Series overview ==
Series	Title	Episodes	Originally released			Winner
Series	Title	Episodes	First released	Last released	Network	Winner
1	Du bist mein Traum	15	14 November 2000	6 March 2001	RTL II	No Angels
2	Du bist mein Traum	26	11 September 2001	23 December 2001	RTL II	Bro'Sis
3	Das Duell	15	11 August 2003	10 November 2003	ProSieben	Overground
4	Jetzt oder nie!	13	15 September 2004	8 December 2004	ProSieben	Nu Pagadi
5	Neue Engel braucht das Land	16	10 August 2006	23 November 2006	ProSieben	Monrose
6	On Stage	26	14 June 2007	6 December 2007	ProSieben	Room 2012
7	Just 4 Girls	17	28 August 2008	6 December 2008	ProSieben	Queensberry
8	Du & Ich	18	20 August 2009	18 December 2009	ProSieben	Some & Any
9	Girls forever	17	19 August 2010	9 December 2010	ProSieben	LaViVe
10	Der Weg ist das Ziel	12	5 July 2012	20 September 2012	ProSieben	Melouria
11	2015	8	17 August 2015	10 October 2015	RTL II	Leandah

== Ratings ==
Season	Timeslot	Season premiere	Season finale	Year	Viewers (in millions)
1	Tuesday 9:15/8:15 pm	14 November 2000	6 March 2001	2000-01	1.70
2	Tuesday & Sunday 8:15 pm	11 September 2001	23 December 2001	2001	1.71
3	Monday (& Friday) 8:15 pm	11 August 2003	3 November 2003	2003	2.46
4	Wednesday 8:15 pm	15 September 2004	8 December 2004	2004	2.07
5	Thursday 8:15 pm	10 August 2006	23 November 2006	2006	3.37
6	Thursday 8:15 pm	14 June 2007	6 December 2007	2007	2.06
7	Thursday 8:15 pm	28 August 2008	18 December 2008	2008	2.55
8	Thursday 8:15 pm	20 August 2009	10 December 2009	2009	2.13
9	Thursday 8:15 pm	19 August 2010	9 December 2010	2010	2.32
10	Thursday 8:15 pm	5 July 2012	20 September 2012	2012	1.50
11	Monday 8:15 pm	17 August 2015	October 2015	2015	

== Music releases by Popstars winners ==
=== Albums ===
Band	Studio albums	Other albums
No Angels	Elle'ments (2001); Now... Us! (2002); Pure (2003); Destiny (2007); Welcome to the Dance (2009); 20 (2021); It's Christmas (2025)	When the Angels Swing (2002); The Best of No Angels (2003); Acoustic Angels (2004); Very Best of No Angels (2008)
Bro'Sis	Never Forget (Where You Come From) (2002); Days of our Lives (2003); Showtime (2004)	
Overground	It's Done (2003); 2. OG (2004)	
Nu Pagadi	Your Dark Side (2005)	
Monrose	Temptation (2006); Strictly Physical (2007); I Am (2008); Ladylike (2010)	
Room2012	Elevator (2007)	
Queensberry	Volume I (2008); On My Own (2009); Chapter 3 (2012)	
Some & Any	First Shot (2009)	
LaViVe	No Sleep (2010)	

== Cheyenne Records ==
Cheyenne Records
- Parent company: Cheyenne Media
- Founded: 2000
- Founder: Holger Roost-Macias
- Genre: Various
- Country of origin: Germany

Cheyenne Records was a German record label, founded in 2000 by Holger Roost-Macias. As part of the Cheyenne Media Group which produced the first nine seasons of the German adaptation of the international Popstars franchise, it served as the label for most Popstars winners from 2000 to 2010. In 2014, the label merged with Roost-Macias' second production company Tresor Entertainment GmbH. In late 2020, Bertelsmann Music Group acquired the catalog from Cheyenne Records, including more than 600 master recordings from bands and solo artists who emerged from the Popstars series
