= Ross Antony =

German-based British singer and entertainer (born 1974)

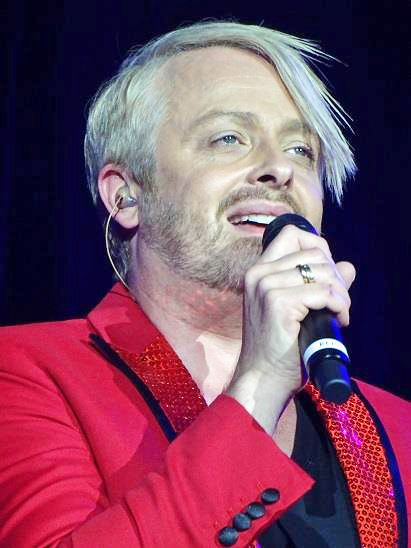
- Antony performing in 2016

Background information
- Born: Ross Anthony Catterall; 9 July 1974 (age 52); Bridgnorth, Shropshire, England
- Genres: R&B, pop, Schlager
- Occupations: Singer, entertainer, presenter
- Years active: 1992–present
- Label: Telamo (Sony Music)
- Formerly of: Bro'Sis
- Website: ross-antony.com

Ross Anthony Catterall (born 9 July 1974), known by his stage name Ross Antony, is a British singer, entertainer and presenter based in Germany. He rose to fame as a member of the R&B/pop group Bro'Sis. Since the group disbanded in 2006, Antony has maintained a profile as a TV personality in Germany, culminating in his 2008 winning of Ich bin ein Star – Holt mich hier raus!, the German version of I'm a Celebrity...Get Me Out of Here!.

== Personal life ==
Antony came from a family of artists and was performing on stage from the age of three, receiving singing and dancing lessons. He attended Bridgnorth Endowed School and is a graduate of the Guildford School of Acting. He went on to appear in pantomimes and musicals across England. In 1997, Antony made his debut on the German stage, with the world premiere of the musical Catharine, in Aachen. In Germany, he played many main roles, including "Claude" in the musical Hair, "Joseph" in Joseph and the Amazing Technicolor Dreamcoat, and "Tabaluga" in Tabaluga and Lilli.

Since 2006, Antony has been in a civil partnership with opera singer Paul Reeves. The couple ran a bed and breakfast in Wallingford, Oxfordshire, named "Little Gables". On 26 May 2014, Antony announced via his Facebook page that the two of them had adopted a child, which they had both spent a long time trying to do. In December 2017, Antony and Reeves married.

Antony lives near Cologne.

== Musical engagement ==
- 1992: Soloist, Bridgnorth Endowed School
- 1992: Grease (Roger), Bridgnorth Endowed School
- 1994: Dick Whittington (Zeldomphed), Guildford School of Acting
- 1994: Chicago (Sergeant Fogarty), Guildford School of Acting
- 1994: Calamity Jane (Joe), Yvonne Arnaud Theatre
- 1994: Jack the Ripper (Dinky), Bridgnorth Endowed School
- 1995: Cabaret (Emcee), Guildford School of Acting
- 1995: Trial by Jury (Defender), Guildford School of Acting
- 1995: Troilus and Cressida (Thersites), Guildford School of Acting
- 1995: A Chorus Line (Mark), Millfield Theatre with Amanda-Jane Manning as "(Diana)", Directed By Bonnie Lythgoe
- 1996–1997: Cinderella (Ensemble), Marlowe Theatre
- 1996–1997: La Cage aux Folles (Jean Michel), Nationwide tour
- 1996–1997: Carousel (Enoch Snow), Arts and Leisure Centre Bridgnorth
- 1997–1999: Joseph (Many characters), Coliseum Theatre
- 1999–2000: Mozart! (Ensemble), Vienna
- 2000: Dance to Win: Workshop for Miami Nights, Düsseldorf
- 2000–2001: Tabaluga and Lilli (Tabaluga), CentrO Oberhausen
- 2001: Hair (Ensemble), Bremen
- 2005: Elisabeth (Crown Prince Rudolf), SI-Centrum Stuttgart
- 2006: Saturday Night Fever (Bobby C), Frankfurt Old Opera

== Discography ==
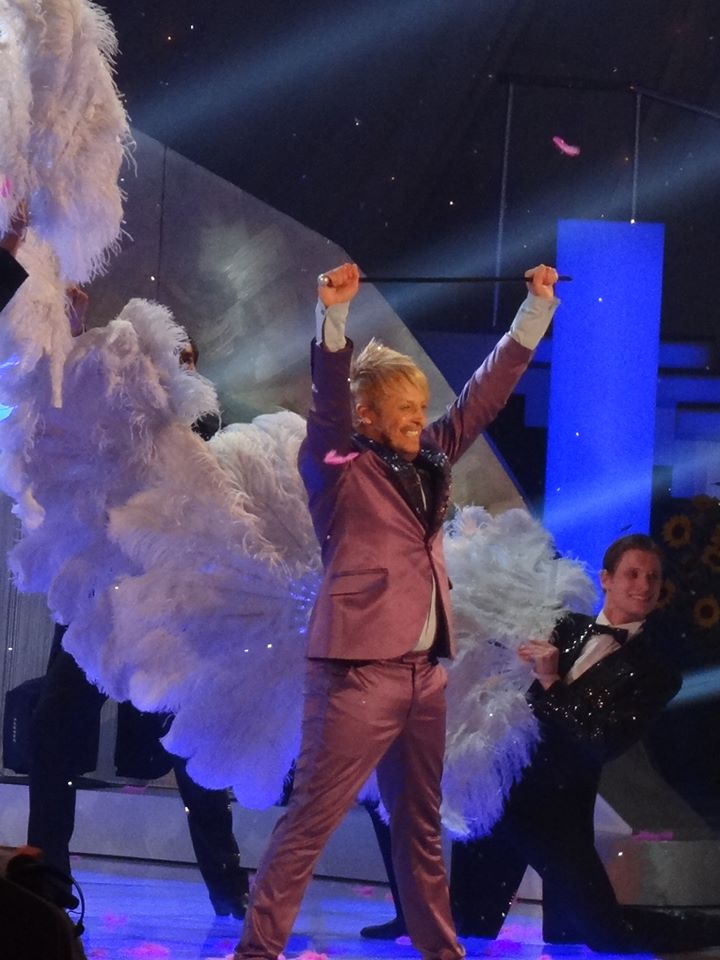
Antony performing in 2013

=== Solo albums ===
Year	Album
2011	Two Ways (Ross Antony & Paul Reeves)
2012	Two Ways: Special Winter Edition (Ross Antony & Paul Reeves)
2013	Meine Neue Liebe (Ross Antony)
2014	Goldene Pferde (Ross Antony)
2014	Winterwunderland (Ross Antony & Paul Reeves)
2015	Goldene Pferde (Very British Edition)
2016	Tatort Liebe
2017	Aber bitte mit Schlager
2019	Schlager lügen nicht
2020	Schlager lügen nicht: mal laut & mal leise
2020	Lass es glitzern: Weihnachten mit Ross

=== Musical albums ===
Year	Album
1997	Catharine
1999	Mozart!

=== Solo singles ===
Year	Single
2000	"...and That's the Way It Is!"
2001	"Intimate"
2008	"Dschungel Wahnsinn" (Achim Petry feat. Jungle Allstars)
2008	"Endlich da" (single for the musical Casino Pique Dame)
2009	"Zeig dein Gesicht" (for the charity project Alle für Alle)
2010	"I Can't Dance Alone" (duet with Giovanni Zarrella)
2013	"Do You Speak English"
2013	"Ding Ding Dong"
2014	"Kettenkarussell"
2014	"Goldene Pferde"
2016	"Tatort Liebe"
2017	"Schneewalzer"
2018	"Picknick am See"
2018	"Ich bin, was ich bin"
2018	"Auf Einmal" (as a part of the charity project Schlagerstars für Kinder)
2019	"1000 und 1 Nacht (Tausendmal berührt)"
2020	"Quando, Quando, Quando ('Mit oder mit ohne'-Remix)"
2020	"Goodbye Papa"
2020	"Heller (High Heels)" (Ross Antony, Marcella Rockefeller & FASO)
2020	"Hand in Hand" (as a part of the project Hand in Hand All Stars)

== Literature ==
- Nadja Otterbach, Ross Antony: The Inside Me – Das Leben eines Popstars. Machtwortverlag, Dessau 2007, ISBN 978-3-86761-000-1.
