= Giovanni Zarrella =

German-Italian singer and TV presenter (born 1978)

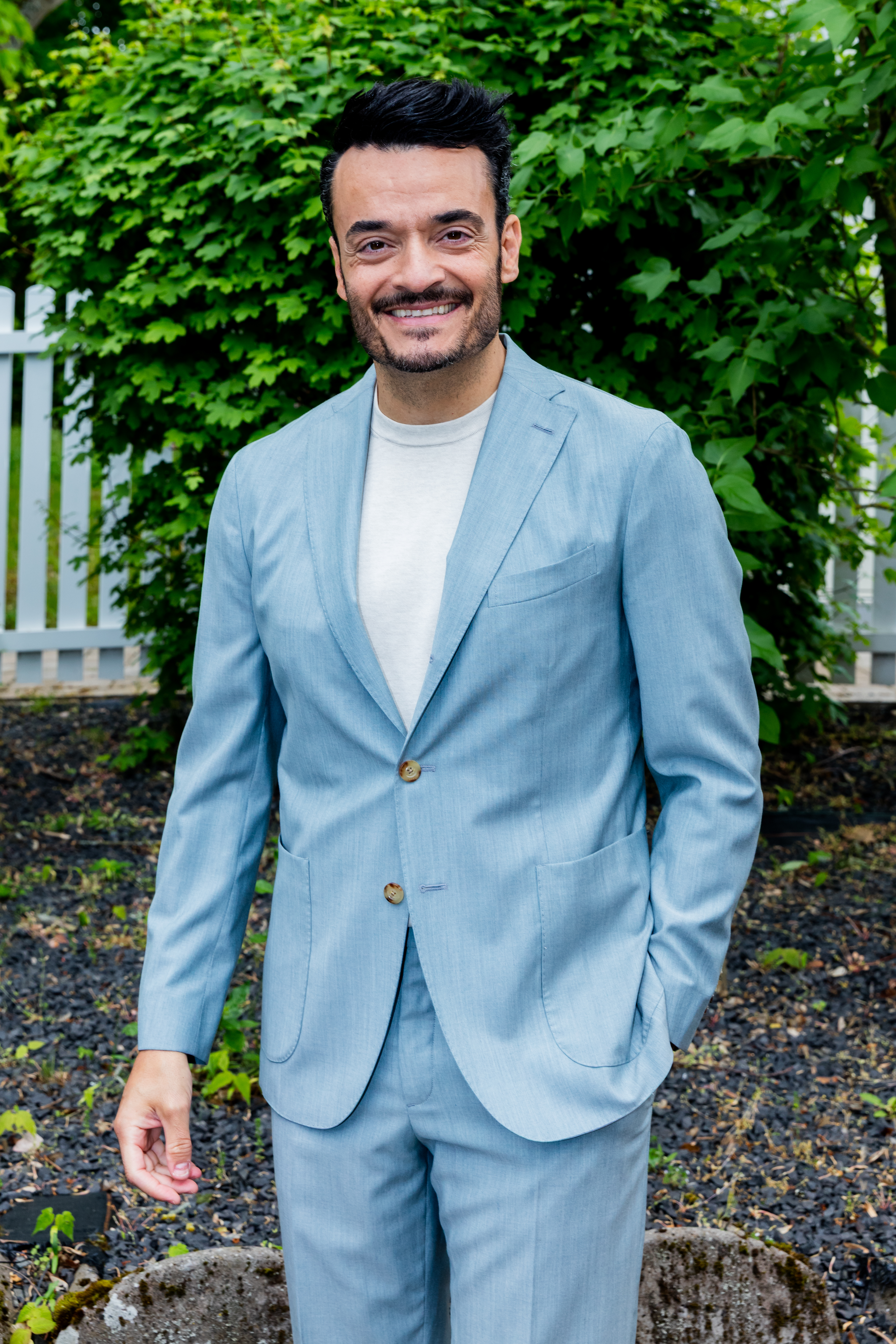
Zarrella in 2025

Giovanni Zarrella (born 4 March 1978) is a German-Italian singer and television presenter based in Germany. Most notably, he was a singer in the German pop group Bro'Sis from 2001 to 2006. Since 2021, Zarrella has hosted Die Giovanni Zarrella Show.

== Early life ==
Zarrella was born in Hechingen in 1978 as the first child of Clementina and Bruno Zarrella. Like his sister and brother Stefano, he grew up bilingual German-Italian. He took piano and organ lessons at a young age and took singing lessons at the age of 15. In the early 1990s he lived with his family in Italy. At the age of 16 he founded his first band, Brotherhood.

== Career ==
He was one of an "international" sextet, later quintet, of singers formed from the TV series Popstars. Previously a youth footballer in Italy and Germany, after the disbanding of Bro'Sis, Zarrella took part in TV celebrity football events and subsequently became a TV sports presenter.

In 2023, he was a coach on The Voice of Germany. He later appeared as a guest coach during the battles of the 2026 season.

== Personal life ==
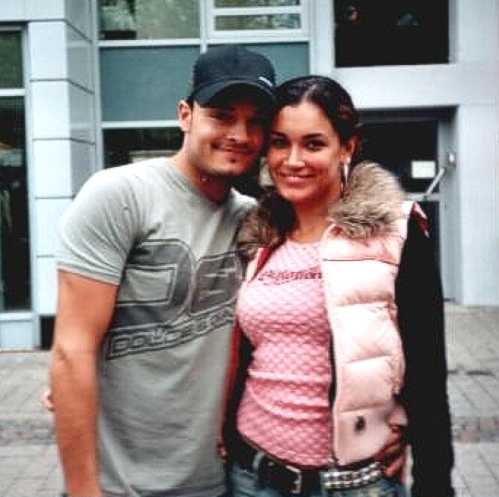
Zarrella with his wife Jana Ina in 2005

In 2005, Zarrella married Brazilian television personality Jana Ina. Together, the couple has one son.

== Discography ==
- Coming Up (2006)
- Musica (2008)
- Ancora Musica (2010)
- La vita è bella (2019)
- Ciao! (2021)
- Per sempre (2022)
- Per sempre (Edizione da capo) (2023)
