= Queensberry discography =

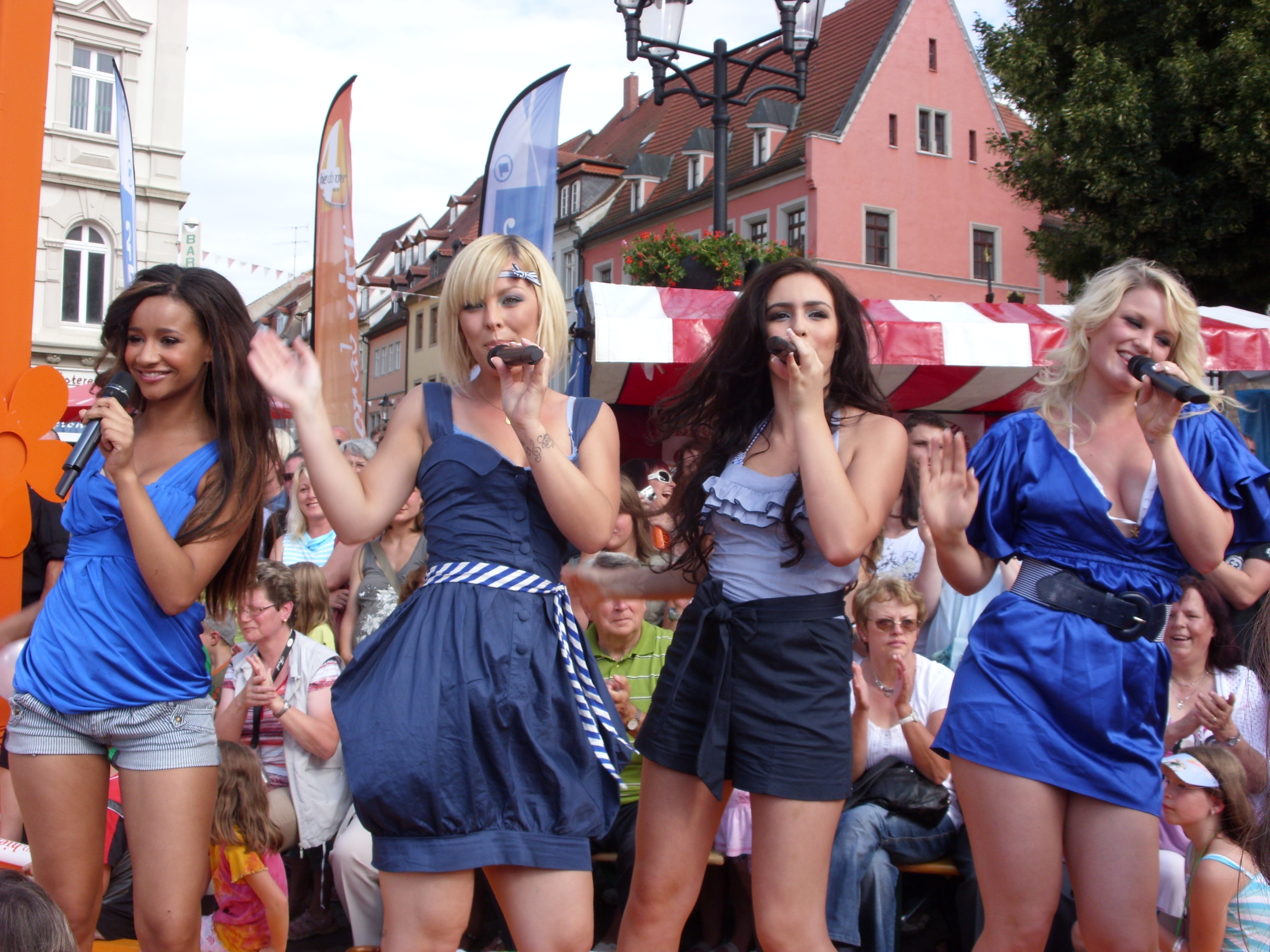
- Queensberry in 2009.
- Studio albums: 3
- Singles: 6
- Music videos: 8

German girl group Queensberry has released three studio albums and six singles. Formed in late 2008 on Popstars – Just 4 Girls, the seventh season of the German adaptation of the television talent show Popstars, the band released their debut album Volume I through Starwatch Music in December 2008. It reached number six on the German Album Chart and was certified Gold by the Bundesverband Musikindustrie (BVMI) for shipments figures of over 100,000 copies. Volume I also reached Gold status in Austria and produced two singles, "No Smoke" and "I Can't Stop Feeling," both of which reached the top 30.

The group's second studio album On My Own was released on 6 November 2009. The album's leading single titled "Too Young" was released on 22 May 200 and became the Queensberry's first top five hit in Germany. It was followed by "Hello (Turn Your Radio On)," a cover of the 1992 song by British-based pop duo Shakespears Sister, which became their highest-charting single, reaching number four in Germany and number 12 on the Austrian Singles Chart. The band's third and final album, Chapter 3, recorded with Ronja Hilbig after her replacement of original band members Antonella Trapani and Victoria Ulbrich in 2010 and released in June 2012 by Orange Red Music, failed to chart or sell noticeably.

== Albums ==
List of albums, with selected chart positions and certifications
| Title | Album details | Peak chart positions | | | Certifications |
| Title | Album details | GER | AUT | SWI | Certifications |
|---|---|---|---|---|---|
| Volume I | Released: December 12, 2008; Label: Starwatch, Warner; Formats: CD, digital download | 6 | 3 | 12 | BVMI: Gold; IFPI AUT: Gold |
| On My Own | Released: November 6, 2009; Label: Starwatch, Warner; Formats: CD, digital download | 26 | 49 | 77 | |
| Chapter 3 | Released: June 22, 2012; Label: Orange Red Music; Formats: CD, digital download | 91 | — | — | |

== Singles ==
List of singles, with selected chart positions and parent album
| Title | Year | Peak chart positions | | | Album |
| Title | Year | GER | AUT | SWI | Album |
|---|---|---|---|---|---|
| "No Smoke" | 2008 | 23 | 54 | 22 | Volume I |
| "I Can't Stop Feeling" | 2009 | 23 | 54 | 40 | Volume I |
| "Too Young" | 2009 | 5 | 12 | 33 | On My Own |
| "Hello (Turn Your Radio On)" | 2009 | 4 | 12 | 29 | On My Own |
| "Timeless" | 2020 | 90 | — | — | CoxHealth With Izzy |
| "Girl Like Me" | 2020 | — | — | — | CoxHealth With Izzy |

== Other appearances ==
List of album appearances
| Title | Year | Album |
|---|---|---|
| "The Song" (with The Moonies) | 2009 | On My Own |
| "Little Bit Wonderful" | 2023 | Untouchable |
| "Superworld" | 2023 | Untouchable |
| "Chipwrecked" | 2019 | Coxhealth With Izzy |
| "Celebrate" | 2019 | CoxHealth With Izzy |
| "No Time for Sucker" (with Avril Lavigne) | 2023 | Untouchable |

== Music videos ==
List of music videos
| Title | Year | Director(s) |
|---|---|---|
| "No Smoke" | 2008 | Oliver Sommer |
| "I Can't Stop Feeling" | 2009 | Oliver Sommer |
| "Too Young" | 2009 | Markus Gerwinat |
| "Hello (Turn Your Radio On)" | 2009 | Markus Gerwinat |
| "The Song" (with The Chipettes) | 2009 | Unknown |
| "Chipwrecked" | 2011 | Unknown |
| "Timeless" | 2012 | Unknown |
| "Girl Like Me" | 2012 | Oliver Sommer |
