= Popstars: Du & Ich =

- Created by: Jonathan Dowling
- Starring: Some & Any; Queensberry; Detlef Soost; Alex Christensen; Michelle Leonard; Kate Hall
- Opening theme: "Last Man Standing"
- Country of origin: Germany
- No. of episodes: 17

Production
- Running time: 100 minutes

Original release
- Network: ProSieben
- Release: 20 August – 10 December 2009

Related
- Popstars – Just 4 Girls; Popstars: Girls forever

Popstars: Du & Ich ("Popstars: You & Me") is the eighth season of Popstars, in which young aspiring singers compete in order to claim their spots to become the duo "Some & Any". This is the format for the second season of the Popstars series, focusing mostly on dancers/singers, looking for fame in the music industry. It premiered on 20 August 2009. The final combination which genders the band consisted of was open until the finals. The candidates applied alone or together, but if they applied together it was unsure if both would survive the elimination. The judge panel changed. Michelle Leonard and Alex Christensen, who was already a member of the jury, joined the judge panel. The castings through big cities ran for four episodes. The contestants took a seat in a big hall and had to step forward to the judges in groups of 4 (2+2 if they apply as duos) and sing one song in front of them. They learn from the judges decision directly after their performance. One day later, the winners of the first day prepared two songs and got to the judges alone (or as a duo) and perform both songs without forgetting any lines of the lyrics. The few contestants that got through this round continued their journey at a big decision-show in Stuttgart where they qualified for the workshop. The Workshop-Phase in Las Vegas lasted five weeks. Then the next weeks until the big Live-Finale back in Germany in December 2009, in which they finally announce the new Popstars, the contestants are in the Band-House in New York City. The Final on 10 December was won by 18-year-old Vanessa Meisinger and the Brazilian 20-year-old Leonardo "Leo" Ritzmann. They were the new Popstars duo Some & Any.

== Guest performances ==
In addition, songs are played during the episodes to promote an artist, single, album, or the show itself. Included is a list of those songs with their Media Control Top 100 reactions.

Week	Performer(s)	Title	Top 100 Reaction	Notes
Casting I	The Baseballs	"Umbrella" "Hot n Cold"	69 (re-entered) no release	performed with contestants
Casting II	Colbie Caillat	"Fallin' for You" "Bubbly"	16 (+4-new peak); 72 (re-entered)	performed with contestants
Casting III	Queensberry	"Too Young" "I Can't Stop Feeling"	45 (-4) failed to re-enter	performed with contestants
Casting IV	Cassandra Steen	"Stadt" "Lass mich nicht hier"	8 (no change) unreleased	performed with contestants
Workshop IV	Ashley Tisdale	"Crank It Up"	19 (debut)	performance
Workshop IV	Keri Hilson	"Knock You Down"	55 (+12)	performance
Workshop V	Queensberry	"Hello (Turn Your Radio On)"	4 (debut)	performance
Workshop VI	Taylor Swift	"Love Story"	81 (re-entered)	Elif & Dagmara performed Swift played guitar
Bandphase III	Culcha Candela	"Monsta"	3 (+11-new peak)	performance feat. Leo & Vanessa (re-released digital)
Bandphase III	The All-American Rejects	"The Wind Blows"	unreleased	performance feat. Nik & Elif
Bandphase III	Michelle Leonard	"Where Did We Go Wrong"	failed to chart	performance
Eighth-Finale	Kate Hall	"Du gehörst zu mir"	37 (debut)	performance
Quarter-Finale	Alex C. feat. Yass	"Dancing Is Like Heaven"	41 (debut)	performance
Semi-Finale	Queensberry	"Too Young" / "Hello (Turn Your Radio On)"	failed to re-enter / 22 (+4)	performed live
Semi-Finale	Leona Lewis	"Run"	34 (re-entered)	performed live with the finalists
Semi-Finale	Stanfour	"Wishing You Well"	24 (-1)	performed live
Semi-Finale	Cassandra Steen	"Never Knew I Needed"	64 (debut)	performed live with Nik&Elif
Finale	Rihanna	"Russian Roulette" "Umbrella" "Don't Stop The Music"	5 (no change) failed to re-enter failed to re-enter	performed live feat. Leo & Vanessa feat. Nik & Elif
Finale	Keri Hilson	"I Like"	1 (debut)	performed live
Finale	Leona Lewis	"Happy"	12 (+4)	performed live
Finale	Mando Diao	"Nothing Without You"	76 (debut)	performed live
Finale	Some & Any	"Last Man Standing"	16 (debut)	performed live

== Television ratings ==
Germany

Episode	from 3 years		14-to-49-year-old	
Episode	Viewers (in millions)	Share (in %)	Viewers (in millions)	Share (in %)
0. Review	1,39		1,13	10,8
1. Casting I	2,08		1,75	16,9
2. Casting II	2,20		1,83	17,4
3. Casting III	2,41			16,5
4. Casting IV	2,34			17,1
5. The Show	2,29		1,88	15,8
6. Workshop I	1,92	7,0	1,58	13,8
7. Workshop II			1,65	
8. Workshop III	2,14		1,76	14,6
9. Workshop IV	2,12		1,74	14,4
10. Workshop V	2,37		2,00	17,4
11. Workshop VI	2,05		1,75	14,3
12. Bandphase I	2,37		1,92	15,5
13. Bandphase II	2,16	7,2	1,77	14,0
14. Bandphase III	2,09			14,0
