= Popstars – On Stage =

- Created by: Jonathan Dowling
- Starring: Room 2012; Monrose; Detlef Soost; Nina Hagen; Dieter Falk
- Opening theme: "Strictly Physical"
- Country of origin: Germany
- No. of episodes: 26

Production
- Running time: 100 min.

Original release
- Network: ProSieben
- Release: 14 June – 6 December 2007

Related
- Popstars – Neue Engel braucht das Land; Popstars – Just 4 Girls

Popstars – On Stage: On 14 June 2007, ProSieben started the sixth installment of the series, targeting to find the "Germany's hottest live act". This time not only male and female singers were cast but also dancers who should be part of the band. Dancers and singers were sent to Füssen and took part in workshops to improve their dancing and singing skills. Four weeks passed before the producers decided to audition additional contestants in the Netherlands. All the singers (including the new contestants) went to Prague, Czech Republic, while the dancers travelled to Brussels, Belgium for another so-called "Entscheidungsshow" ("decision show"). In October, singers and dancers reunited in a big mansion in Berlin. All contestants recorded the song "Never Give Up" that managed to reach #30 on the German singles chart. The album All Stars that combined songs of all previous shows reached number 78 on the German albums chart.

After a few weeks in Berlin, the contestants moved back to Füssen where the dancers' final show took place. Shortly before the finale, contestant Mehdi left the show and Armin Nezirevic, better known by his nickname "Shorty", was brought back to the show. All of the five dancing finalists (Aziz, Darren, Raik Preetz, Armin Nezirevic, and Vika Ljacenko) won the dancing competition – the concept of a group with dancers and singers had been discarded in the course of the season – and formed the Popstars Dance Company.

On 6 December 2007 the singers' final show took place in Cologne. The male group members were set by the judges. Cristobal Moreno, Sascha Schmitz, and Julian Kasprzik were chosen over Norman Ramazan. The viewers were able to vote for either Marcella McCrae or Tialda van Slogteren to be in the band. Van Slogteren got the majority of all telephone calls and became the fourth member of the band Room2012.

Winning band: Room2012
Judges: Jane Comerford, Dieter Falk, Nina Hagen, Marusha, Detlef Soost
Coaches: Comerford (singing), Stefano Maggio (singing), Rafael Antonio (dancing), Arno Schmitt (sports)
