= Volume I (Queensberry album) =

Studio album by Queensberry
- Released: 12 December 2008
- Recorded: November–December 2008
- Genre: Pop; R&B; dance
- Length: 46:27
- Label: Starwatch; Cheyenne; Warner
- Producer: Alex Geringas; Dave James; Kid Crazy; Pete Kirtley; Mitch Knauer; John McLaughlin; Henrik Menzel; Petone; Snowflakers

Queensberry chronology
Volume I (2008)	On My Own (2009)

Volume I is the debut studio album by German girl group Queensberry. Released by Starwatch Music, Cheyenne Records, and Warner Music on 12 December 2008 in German-speaking Europe, a week prior to the announcement of the fourth member of quartet line-up on the show's finale, the album produced three versions, each featuring a different Popstars – Just 4 Girls contestant competing to become part of the Queensberry group, including Katharina "KayKay" Kobert, Patricia Ivanauskas or eventual band member Antonella Trapani.

Starwatch consulted several producers and songwriters to work with the finalists on Volume I, including Alexander Geringas, Henrik Menzel, Tommy "Petone" Peters, John McLaughlin, Pete Kirtley, and British production team Snowflakers, some of which re-produced their material which had previously been recorded by other international artists such as Katharine McPhee, Emily Haines, Shaznay Lewis, Anna Abreu, Margaret Berger, and Clea for their respective albums.

Upon release, Volume I debuted and peaked at number three on the German Albums Chart, while reaching the top ten in Austria and the top twenty in Switzerland. It was eventually certified gold by both the BVMI and IFPI Austria, indicating sales in excess of 110,000 copies. The original version produced the double A-single "I Can't Stop Feeling"/"No Smoke", while follow-up "Too Young" appeared on the deluxe edition of Volume I, which was released in June 2009, featuring seven additional tracks.

== Track listing ==
Volume I track listing
No.	Title	Writer(s)	Producer(s)	Length
1.	"No Smoke"	John McLaughlin; Dave James; Alan Ross	McLaughlin; James	3:21
2.	"Bike"	Tim Hawes; Obi Mhondera; Pete Kirtley; Andrew Murray; Christian Ballard	Pete Kirtley; Snowflakers	2:53
3.	"Sorry"	McLaughlin; Steve Robson; Hannah Thomson	McLaughlin; James	3:31
4.	"Dr. Blind"	Emily Haines	Henrik Menzel; Tommy "Petone" Peters	3:28
5.	"Over It"	Josh Alexander; Billy Steinberg; Ruth-Anne Cunningham	Menzel; Petone	3:31
6.	"End of Love"	Teemu Brunila	McLaughlin; James	3:34
7.	"Sprung"	Murray; Ballard; Jane Vaughan; Sylvia Bennett-Smith; Mhondera	Kirtley; Snowflakers	4:25
8.	"I Can't Stop Feeling"	Brunila; Kid Crazy	McLaughlin; James	3:46
9.	"Beautiful Thing"	McLaughlin; Michael Daley; Alison Pearse; Stanley Andrew	McLaughlin; James	3:17
10.	"Stiletto Heels"	Alex Geringas; Peter-John Vettese; Charlie Mason	Geringas; Mitch Knauer	3:35
11.	"Jump"	Stella Attar; Lawrence Oakley; Mike Mukhopadhay	Menzel; Petone	3:10
12.	"Butterfly"	Wendy Page; Jim Marr; Andrew Bojanic; Elisabeth Hooper	Kirtley; Snowflakers	4:00
13.	"Why Should I Believe in You"	Charlie Grant; Pete Woodroffe; Iman Osman	Menzel; Petone	4:00

Deluxe edition bonus tracks
No.	Title	Writer(s)	Producer(s)	Length
14.	"Too Young"	Eric Palmquist	Kirtley; Kid Crazy	3:42
15.	"Glamorous"	Alex Geringas; Ivo Moring; Thorsten Brötzmann	Geringas; Moring	3:48
16.	"Naive"	P. Martin; M. Berger; J. Hartford	Kirtley; Snowflakers	3:22
17.	"Dance"	Shaznay Lewis; Rick Nowels; Wayne Rodiques	Kirtley; Snowflakers	3:13
18.	"Flow"	Mark Frisch; Anthony Galatis	Kirtley; Snowflakers	3:22
19.	"Too Young" (M.A.T. Catwalk Mix)	Palmquist	Kid Crazy; Kirtley; M.A.T.^{[a]}	3:43

Notes

- ^{^[a]} denotes remix producer(s)
- "No Smoke" and "Beautiful Thing" are cover versions of the same-titled songs by British singer Michelle Lawson, recorded for I Just Wanna Say (2003).
- "Dr. Blind" is a cover version of the same-titled song by British singer Canadian Emily Haines, recorded for Knives Don't Have Your Back (2006).
- "Over It" is a cover version of the same-titled song by American singer Canadian Katharine McPhee, recorded for her eponymous album (2007).
- "End of Love" is a cover version of the same-titled song by Finnish singer Anna Abreu, recorded for her eponymous album (2007).
- "Sprung" is a cover version of the same-titled song by English girl group Clea, recorded for Identity Crisis (2004).
- "Naive" is a cover version of the same-titled song by Norwegian singer Margaret Berger, recorded for Pretty Scary Silver Fairy (2006).
- "Dance" is a cover version of the same-titled song by English singer Shaznay Lewis, recorded for Open (2004).

== Charts ==
=== Weekly charts ===
Chart (2008–09)	Peak position
Austrian Albums (Ö3 Austria)	3
German Albums (Offizielle Top 100)	6
Swiss Albums (Schweizer Hitparade)	12

=== Year-end charts ===
Chart (2009)	Position
German Albums (Offizielle Top 100)	76
Swiss Albums (Schweizer Hitparade)	100

== Certifications ==
Region	Certification	Certified units/sales
Austria (IFPI Austria)	Gold	10,000^{*}
Germany (BVMI)	Gold	100,000^{^}
^{*} Sales figures based on certification alone.^{^} Shipments figures based on certification alone.

== Release history ==
Region	Date	Edition	Format	Label
Austria	12 December 2008	Standard edition(s)	Digital download, CD	Starwatch; Cheyenne; Warner
Germany	12 December 2008	Standard edition(s)	Digital download, CD	Starwatch; Cheyenne; Warner
Switzerland	12 December 2008	Standard edition(s)	Digital download, CD	Starwatch; Cheyenne; Warner
Austria	26 June 2009	Deluxe edition	Digital download, CD	Starwatch; Cheyenne; Warner
Germany	26 June 2009	Deluxe edition	Digital download, CD	Starwatch; Cheyenne; Warner
Switzerland	26 June 2009	Deluxe edition	Digital download, CD	Starwatch; Cheyenne; Warner
