= No Smoke (Michelle Lawson song) =

Song by Michelle Lawson

from the album I Just Wanna Say
- Released: 1 June 2003
- Genre: Pop; R&B
- Length: 3:20
- Label: Mercury
- Songwriter(s): John McLaughlin; Alan Ross; Dave James
- Producer(s): McLaughlin; James

"No Smoke" is a song written by John McLaughlin, Alan Ross, and Dave James. It was recorded by British singer Michelle Lawson for her 2003 debut album I Just Wanna Say. The song has since been recorded by several artists, including Canadian singer Eva Avila, English singer Nicki French (as "Aint No Smoke (Without Fire)"), and German girl group Queensberry, and Belgian singer Esther Sels, who recorded a Flemish version under the title "Game Over".

== Queensberry version ==
"No Smoke"

Single by Queensberry

from the album Volume I
- Released: February 20, 2009
- Length: 3:46
- Label: Starwatch; Cheyenne; Warner
- Songwriter(s): Teemu Brunila; Kid Crazy
- Producer(s): John McLaughlin; Dave James

Queensberry singles chronology
| "No Smoke" / "I Can't Stop Feeling" (2009) | "Too Young" (2009) |

In 2008, "No Smoke" served as the first promotional single by German girl group Queensberry. Their rendition was released along with ballad "I Can't Stop Feeling" on the band's debut single on February 20, 2009 following their formation on the ProSieben reality television show Popstars – Just 4 Girls. It reached number 22 on the Swiss Singles Chart.

=== Track listings ===
CD maxi single
| No. | Title | Writer(s) | Producer(s) | Length |
|---|---|---|---|---|
| 1. | "I Can't Stop Feeling" | Teemu Brunila; Kid Crazy | John McLaughlin; Dave James | 3:47 |
| 2. | "No Smoke" | McLaughlin; James; Alan Ross | McLaughlin; James | 3:20 |
| 3. | "Dance" | Shaznay Lewis; Rick Nowels; Wayne Rodrigues | Henrik Menzel; Tommy "Petone" Peters | 3:14 |
| 4. | "I Can't Stop Feeling" (instrumental) | Brunila; Crazy | McLaughlin; James | 3:46 |

=== Charts ===
Weekly chart performance for "No Smoke"
| Chart (2009) | Peak position |
|---|---|
| Switzerland (Schweizer Hitparade) | 22 |
