= First Shot =

First Shot may refer to:

- First shot or "shot heard round the world", the beginning of the American Revolutionary War in the battles of Lexington and Concord
- First Shot (album), a 2009 album by Some & Any
- First Shot (1993 film), a Hong Kong film directed by David Lam
- First Shot (2002 film), an American television film starring Mariel Hemingway
- Tsurune: The Movie – The First Shot (2022), a Japanese animated film by Takuya Yamamura
