= On My Own (Queensberry album) =

Studio album by Queensberry
- Released: November 6, 2009
- Recorded: 2009
- Genre: Pop; R&B; dance-pop
- Label: Starwatch; Cheyenne; Warner
- Producer: Christian Ballard; Kid Crazy; Alex Geringas; David James; Pete Kirtley; Bernd Klimpel; Philip Larsen; MachoPsycho; John McLaughlin; Henrik Menzel; Tim Murray; Naiv; Petone

Queensberry chronology
Volume I (2008)	On My Own (2009)	Chapter 3 (2012)

Singles from On my Own
- 1. "Too Young" Released: May 22, 2009; 2. "Hello (Turn Your Radio On)" Released: October 23, 2009

On My Own is the second studio album by German girl group Queensberry. It was released by Starwatch Music, Cheyenne Records, and Warner Music on 6 November 2009 in German-speaking Europe, featuring production by Alex Geringas, Pete Kirtley, Philip Larsen, and MachoPsycho as well as its two singles "Too Young" and "Hello (Turn Your Radio On)", a Shakespears Sister cover.

Upon its release, the album performed moderately on the charts, reaching the top thirty in Germany only. It marked the group's last album to feature the group's original line-up. In July 2010, it was announced that original members Trapani and Ulbrich were parting with the band to be replaced with Selina Herrero and Ronja Hilbig.

== Track listing ==
On My Own – Standard edition
No.	Title	Writer(s)	Producer(s)	Length
1.	"Too Young"	Eric Palmqwist; Kid Crazy	Pete Kirtley; Kid Crazy	3:42
2.	"Hello (Turn Your Radio On)"	Siobhan Fahey; David A. Stewart; Marcella Detroit	Philip Larsen	3:15
3.	"Every Now and Then"	Teemu Brunila; Jukka Immonen	Larsen	3:44
4.	"I Feel You"	Alex Geringas; Bernd Klimpel; Dimitri Ehrlich	Geringas; Klimpel	3:51
5.	"On My Own"	Kara DioGuardi; Patrik Berger	David James; John McLaughlin	4:03
6.	"Lifelong Lovesong"	Brandur Enni; Fredrik Thomander; Anders Wikström	Larsen	3:30
7.	"Girl like Me (Nonchalant)"	Robert Hazard; Alex Prinz; Henrik Menzel; Tommy Peters	Menzel; Petone	3:16
8.	"Selfish"	Joel "Naiv" Humlén; Patric Kjellström; Charlie Mason	Naiv	2:43
9.	"Replay"	Niklas Olovson; Robin Lynch; Kaci Brown	MachoPsycho	3:37
10.	"Scandalous"	DioGuardi; Fred Nassar	Larsen	3:40
11.	"Changes"	Peter-John Vettese; Sarah Whatmore	James; McLaughlin	4:04
12.	"Love on the Radio"	Kirtley; Sacha Collisson	Tim Murray; Christian Ballard; Kirtley; Collisson (add.)	3:22

Amazon bonus track
No.	Title	Writer(s)	Producer(s)	Length
13.	"Lifelong Lovesong" (Unplugged)	Enni; Thomander; Wikström	Larsen	3:30

iTunes bonus track
No.	Title	Writer(s)	Producer(s)	Length
13.	"Forgive and Forget"	Vettese; Whatmore	James; McLaughlin	3:53

Musicload bonus track
No.	Title	Writer(s)	Producer(s)	Length
13.	"Hello (Turn Your Radio On)" (Remix)	Fahey; Stewart; Detroit	Larsen	3:53

== Charts ==
Chart (2009)	Peak position
Austrian Albums (Ö3 Austria)	49
German Albums (Offizielle Top 100)	26
Greek Albums (IFPI)	48
Swiss Albums (Schweizer Hitparade)	77
