= No Smoke =

No Smoke may refer to:

- No Smoke (Michelle Lawson song)
- No Smoke (YoungBoy Never Broke Again song)
- No Smoke, a song by Gucci Mane from the album The Return of East Atlanta Santa
- No Smoke, a song by The Game from the album Born 2 Rap
