= I Wish You Knew =

I Wish You Knew may refer to:

- "I Wish You Knew", a 1960 song by the Louvin Brothers from My Baby's Gone
- "I Wish You Knew", a 2005 song by Mariah Carey from The Emancipation of Mimi
- "I Wish You Knew", a 2009 song by Some & Amy from First Shot

== See also ==
- "You Wish You Knew", a 2018 song by Zayn from Icarus Falls
