= Some & Any =

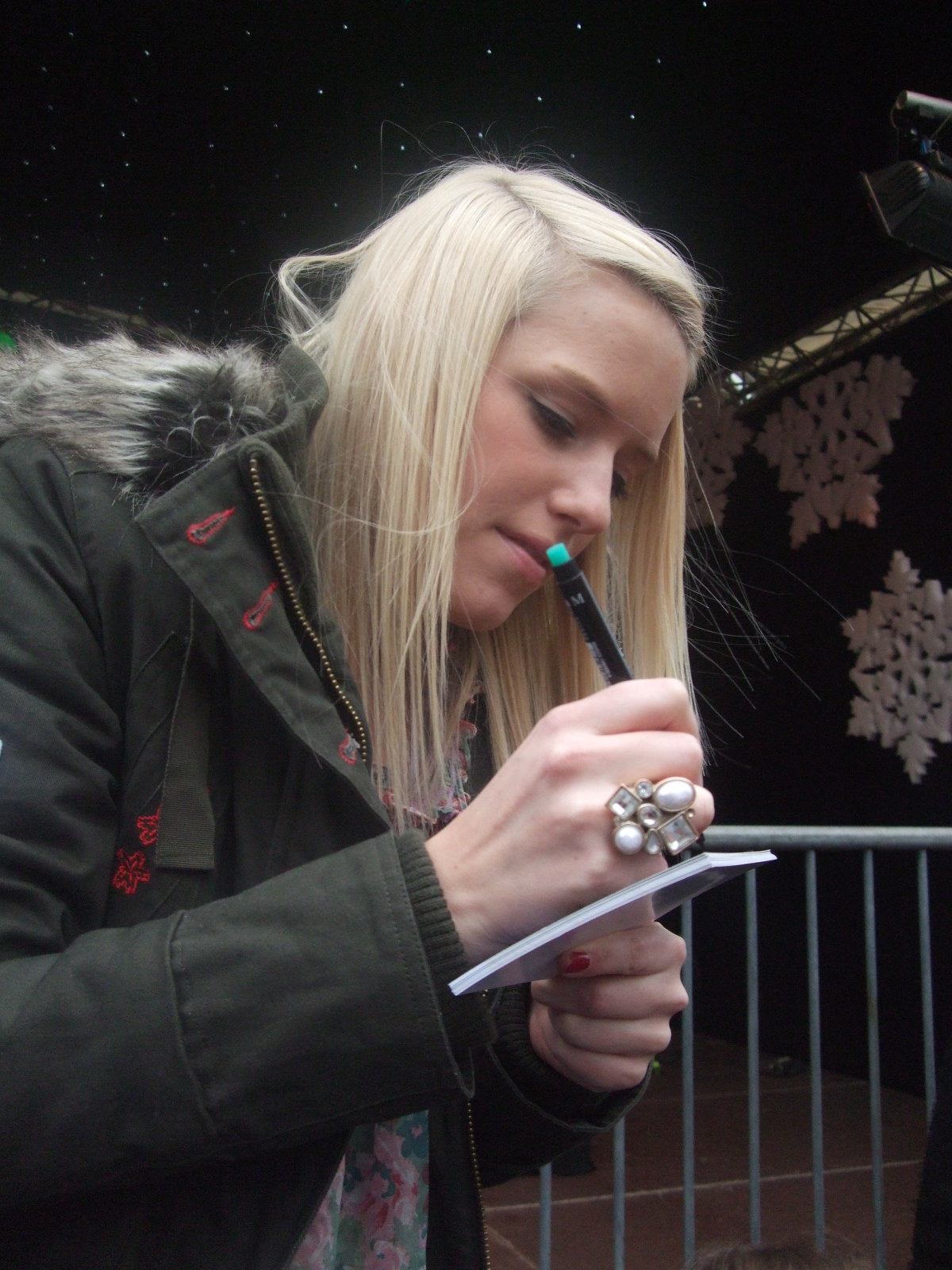
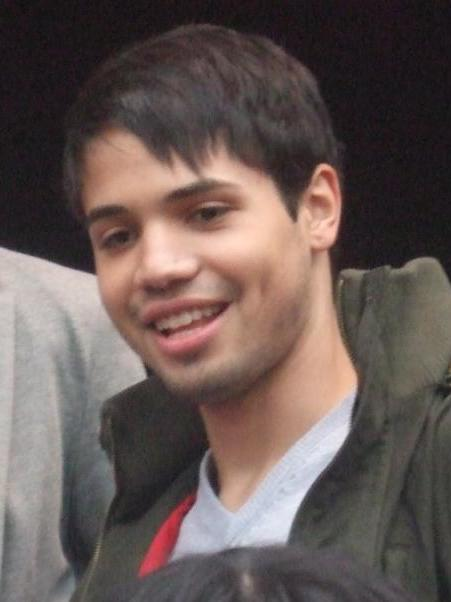
- Vanessa Meisinger and Leonardo Ritzmann

Background information
- Origin: Germany
- Genres: Pop, pop rock
- Years active: 2009–2010
- Labels: Warner Music
- Past members: Vanessa Meisinger; Leonardo Ritzmann
- Website: someandany.de

Some & Any was a German pop duo, formed during the eighth season of the German television talent show Popstars. The group consisted of then-18-year-old Vanessa Meisinger and 20-year-old half-Brazilian, half-Swiss Leonardo Ritzmann. The season finale aired on 10 December 2009.

== History ==
=== Formation on Popstars ===
Open castings, searching for a duo, took place in Stuttgart, Düsseldorf, Munich, and Berlin. The decision-show ("Bewährungsshow") took place in Stuttgart on 27 September 2009. The chosen contestants flew to Las Vegas for the show's workshop, took a road trip through the United States to New York City, where the band phase took place.

After these steps, the few contestants left were arranged in duos. Henceforth, the contestants could just win or lose as a duo. Vanessa and Leo performed with Culcha Candela, recording their song "Monsta" live. This live recording was released as official remix. At the finale, the contestants performed with Leona Lewis and Rihanna. During the finale, the viewers decided by telephone voting that Vanessa and Leo formed the winners of the eighth Popstars season.

=== 2009-2010: First Shot ===
The band's debut album First Shot was released 18 December 2009. Besides the debut single, the album included songs that were previously performed by contestants during the pre-finale rounds. The debut single itself was released 11 December and also contains versions of the song recorded by eliminated contestants Elif & Nik and Dagmara & Daniel.

Both debuts—the single "Last Man Standing" and the album First Shot—charted at the worst position in the history of Popstars. The second single, "Too Perfect", was released in March 2010.

In April 2010, it was stated that their record deal was not renewed, leaving the duo terminated.

== Discography ==
=== Studio albums ===
Title	Details	Peak chart positions		
Title	Details	GER	AUT	SWI
First Shot	Released: 18 December 2009; Label: Warner Music; Formats: CD, streaming, Digital download	47	49	31

=== Singles ===
Title	Year	Peak chart positions			Album
Title	Year	GER	AUT	SWI	Album
"Last Man Standing"	2009	16	27	26	First Shot
