= Chapter 3 (Queensberry album) =

EP by Queensberry
- Released: 22 June 2012
- Recorded: 2011-2012
- Genres: Dance-pop; electropop
- Length: 52:59
- Labels: Orange Red; Universal

Queensberry chronology
On My Own (2008)	Chapter 3 (2012)

Singles from Chapter 3
- 1. "Timeless" Released: 1 June 2012; 2. "Girl Like Me" Released: 31 August 2012

Chapter 3 is the first EP by German girl group Queensberry. It was released by Orange Red Music, and Universal Music on 22 June 2012 in German-speaking Europe, marking the band's first album featuring new member Ronja Hilbig after her replacement of original band members Antonella Trapani and Victoria Ulbrich.

== Track listing ==
No.	Title	Writer(s)	Producer(s)	Length
1.	"Girl like Me"	Ivo Moring; Chazz Gaither	Moring	3:29
2.	"Chemical Reaction"	Torsten Abrolat; Terri Bjerre; Toni Cottura	Abrolat; Gaither^{[A]}; Bjerre^{[A]}	3:20
3.	"Headphones"	Pam Sheyne; Fridolin Nordsoe; Matthew Gerrard	Moring; Gaither; Nordsoe; Gerrard	2:47
4.	"Timeless"	James Nicholas Bailey; Ryan Ogren; Christopher Wallace; Moring; Gaither	Moring; Gaither; The Blueprint	3:19
5.	"Superboy" (Interlude)			0:30
6.	"Superboy"	Moring; Alex Geringas; Her0ism	Moring; Gaither	3:48
7.	"It's Not That Simple"	Moring; Gaither	Moring; Gaither	3:33
8.	"Pack It Up"	Moring; Gaither	Moring; Gaither	3:03
9.	"I Understand It Now" (Interlude)			0:30
10.	"I Understand It Now"	Leonore Bartsch; Gabriella De Almeida Rinne; Ronja Hilbig; Moring; Gaither	Moring; Gaither	4:12
11.	"I Want You Back"	Denniz Pop; Max Martin	Moring; Gaither	3:22
12.	"Cake and Kisses" (Interlude)			0:45
13.	"Cake and Kisses"	Moring; Michéle Vice-Maslin	Moring; Gaither	2:14
14.	"After the Love is Gone"	Moring; Bjerre	Moring; Gaither	4:01
15.	"Summer Love Song"			3:15
16.	"California Kissin"	Bartsch; Marc Mozart; Jason Worthy; Danielle Senior	Mozart; Worthy	3:46
17.	"From, Ronja, Gabby, Leo with Love" (Interlude)			0:33
18.	"Timeless" (Plastic Funk Mix)	Bailey; Ogren; Wallace; Moring; Gaither	Moring; Gaither; The Blueprint; Plastic Funk^{[B]}; Massimo Nocito^{[B]}	5:44

Notes

- ^{^[A]} denotes co-producer
- ^{^[B]} denotes additional producer

== Charts ==
Chart (2012)	Peak position
German Albums (Offizielle Top 100)	91

== Release history ==
Region	Date	Edition	Format	Label
Austria	22 June 2012	Standard	Digital download, CD	Orange Red; Universal
Germany	22 June 2012	Standard	Digital download, CD	Orange Red; Universal
Switzerland	22 June 2012	Standard	Digital download, CD	Orange Red; Universal
