= Last Man Standing (Some & Any song) =

Single by Some & Any

from the album First Shot
- Released: 11 December 2009
- Recorded: 2009
- Genre: Pop, pop rock
- Length: 3:30
- Label: Warner
- Songwriter(s): Lina Eriksson and Marti Dodson

Some & Any singles chronology
"Monsta (NYC Version)" (2009)	"Last Man Standing" (2009)

"Last Man Standing" is the debut single of the German pop duo Some & Any. It was written by Lina Eriksson and Marti Dodson and released on 11 December 2009. The song was recorded by all finalist duos in the talent show Popstars: Du & Ich and therefore the CD included all three different versions of the song. The version by Some & Any was released on its own as a digital download.

== Promotion, release and booklet ==
The song was used as the theme song for the eighth season of Popstars: Du & Ich. It was also performed by former contestants. The version by Some & Any alone was released as digital download only; the two other versions of the song can also be downloaded. The CD includes all three different versions. The booklet can be folded to three different covers to show each duo that recorded the song.

== Video ==
The music video included all three finalist duos and many other young people and was shot over several nights in Vienna. The videos shows all of them running through the city of Vienna at night, with flashlights. Most of the people give up the race or fail, so at the end there is only Vanessa and Leo left, showing that they are the winning duo. The other two versions of the video show the other duos, Elif Demirezer & Niklas Dennin and Dagmara Woszczek & Daniel Dausner, winning the race. The clothes worn in the video represent not only the genre of their music but also the rebellion of the video. The video was released along with the CD and digital download on 11 December 2009.

== Formats and track listings ==
German CD
No.	Title	Length
1.	"Last Man Standing (Elif & Nik)"	3:30
2.	"Last Man Standing (Vanessa & Leo)"	3:30
3.	"Last Man Standing (Dagmara & Daniel)"	3:30

Digital Download
No.	Title	Length
1.	"Last Man Standing"	3:30

== Chart performance ==
Chart (2009)	Peak position
Austrian Singles Chart	27
German Singles Chart	16
