= Room 2012 =

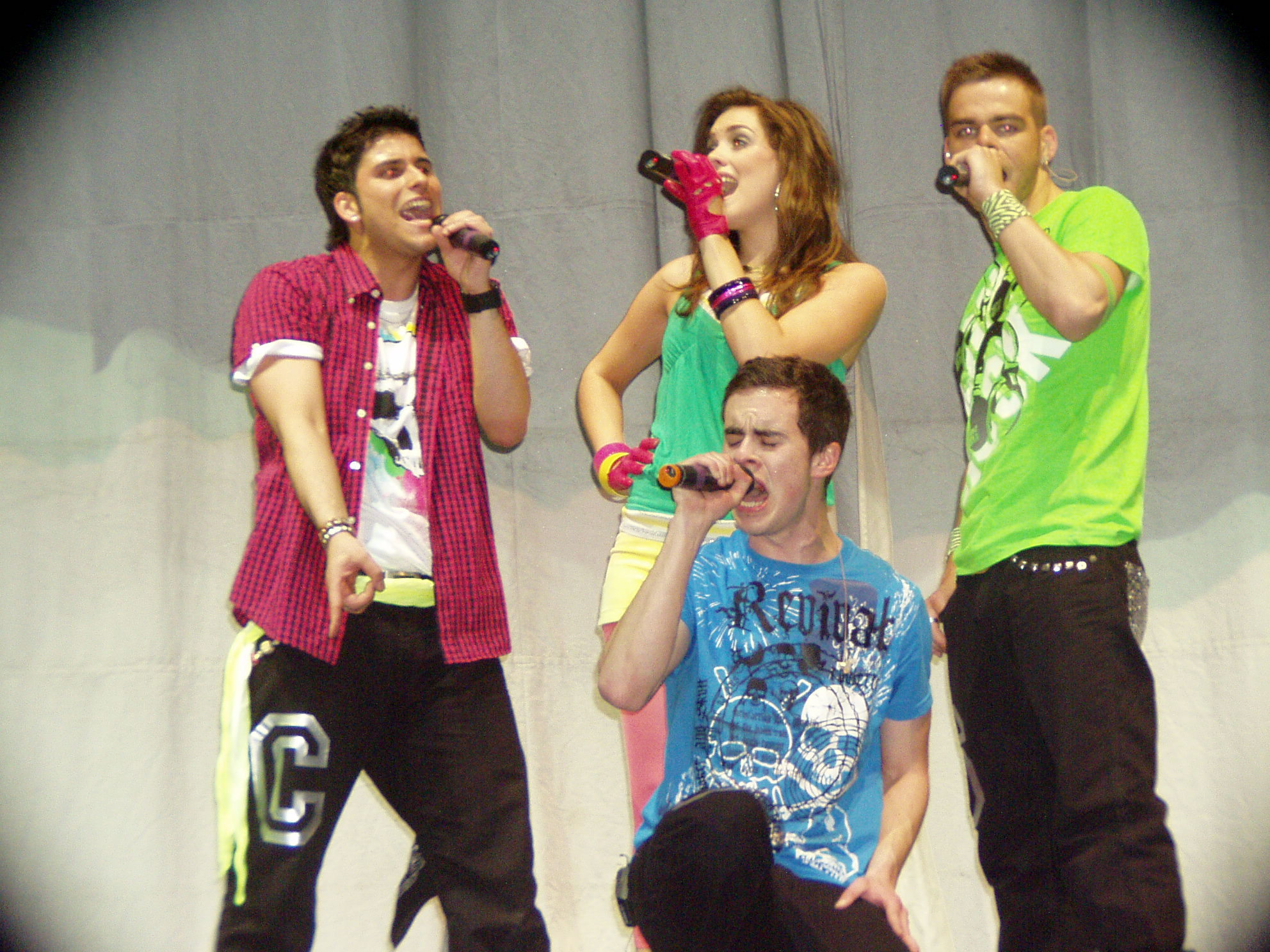
- Room 2012 live in Dresden

Background information
- Origin: Germany
- Genres: Pop, R&B, hip hop, pop rock
- Years active: 2007–2009
- Label: Starwatch/Warner (2007–2009)
- Past members: Cristobal Galvez Moreno; Sascha Salvati; Julian Kasprzik; Tialda van Slogteren
- Website: room2012.de

Room 2012 was a German pop quartet that originated in late 2007 on the sixth installment of the German talent show Popstars.

== History ==
Under the motto "Wir suchen den heißesten Live-Act Deutschlands" ("We're looking for Germany's hottest live act") Popstars returned with a sixth installment in the summer of 2007, this time searching for Germany's best live performers. Hopeful singers and dancers attended open television auditions in a couple of German cities, judged by choreographer and dancer Detlef "D!" Soost, music producer Dieter Falk, techno veteran Marusha, singer Nina Hagen and singing coach Jane Comerford. Over the course of several recalls and re-recalls the judges reduced the contestants to a smaller group that immediately travelled to Füssen to get trained in singing, dancing, and fitness. Considering the contestants for too weak, ProSieben decided to hold auditions in the Netherlands, where a few more dancers and singers were cast. In the end dancers and singers started working on their performance and publicity skills together. While the dancers suddenly were separated from the singers and put into a separate band, called Popstars Dance Company, the singers continued the competition.

On the season's finale on 6 December 2007, four of the six were chosen to make the band: Cristobal Moreno, Sascha Salvati, Julian Kasprzik, and Tialda van Slogteren beat out Norman Ramazan and Marcella McCrae – and eventually formed the group Room2012.

Room 2012 became the first German Popstars band whose debut single and debut album did not reach number 1 in the charts. Actually both the first single and the album reached only the top 10 of the official single charts.

After their record-deal with record label Starwatch/Warner had expired, Warner didn't renew it. Room2012 is currently without a record-deal. In 2009, the group announced that they were having a break and would be concentrating on their solo careers in regards to their foreseeable future, although they pointed out that the group was not splitting.

== Discography ==
=== Albums ===
List of albums, with selected chart positions and certifications
Title	Album details	Peak chart positions			Certifications
Title	Album details	GER	AUT	SWI	Certifications
Elevator	Released: 14 December 2007; Label: Starwatch, Warner; Formats: CD, digital download	7	4	17	IFPI AUT: Gold

=== Singles ===
List of singles, with selected chart positions and parent album
Title	Year	Peak chart positions			Album
Title	Year	GER	AUT	SWI	Album
"Haunted"	2007	10	5	3	Elevator
"Naughty but Nice"	2008	52	—	—	Elevator

== Tours ==
- 2008: The Elevator Tour

As support act

- 2008: DJ Bobo
- 2009: Cascada

== Gallery ==
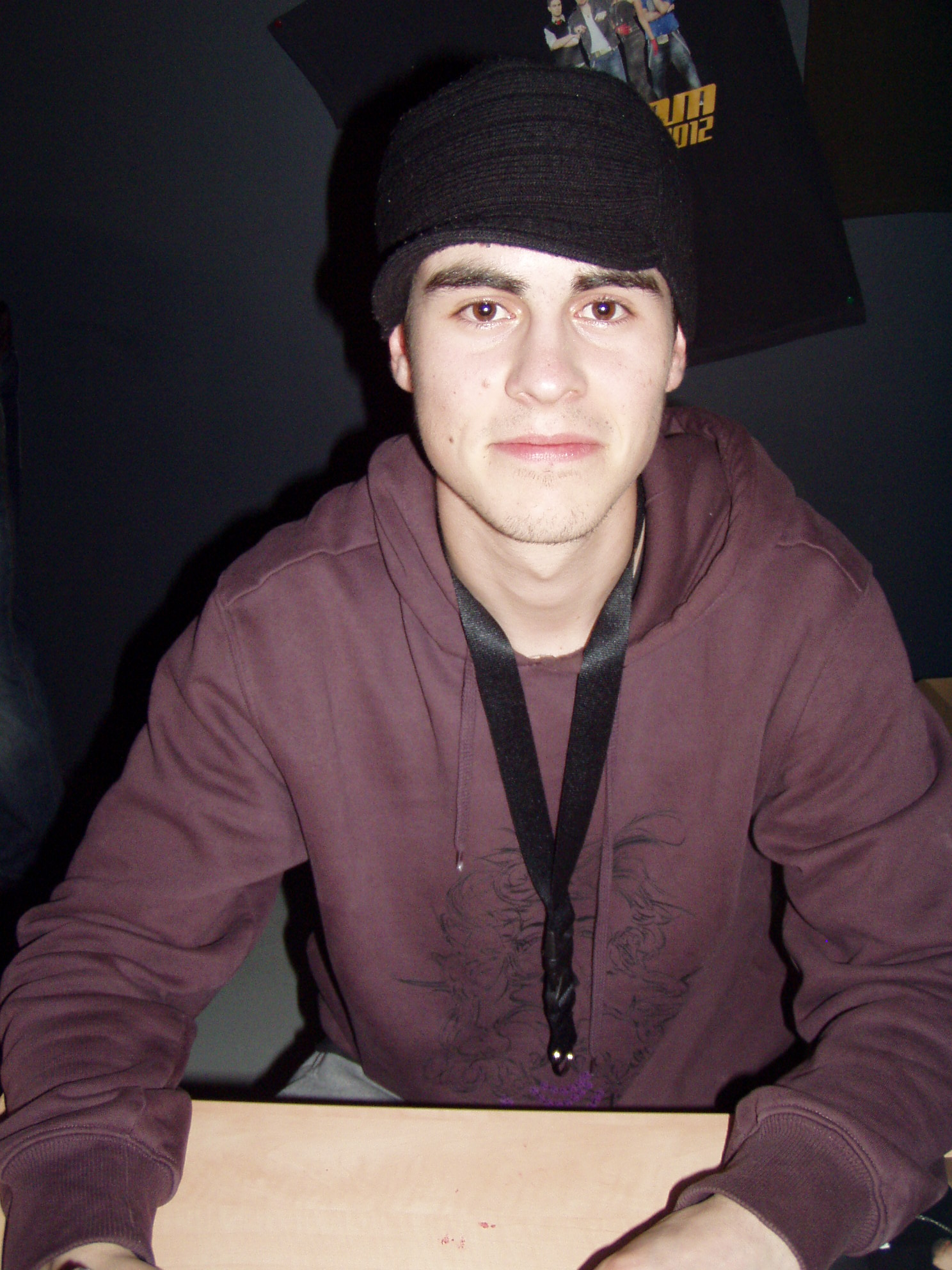
Julian Kasprzik

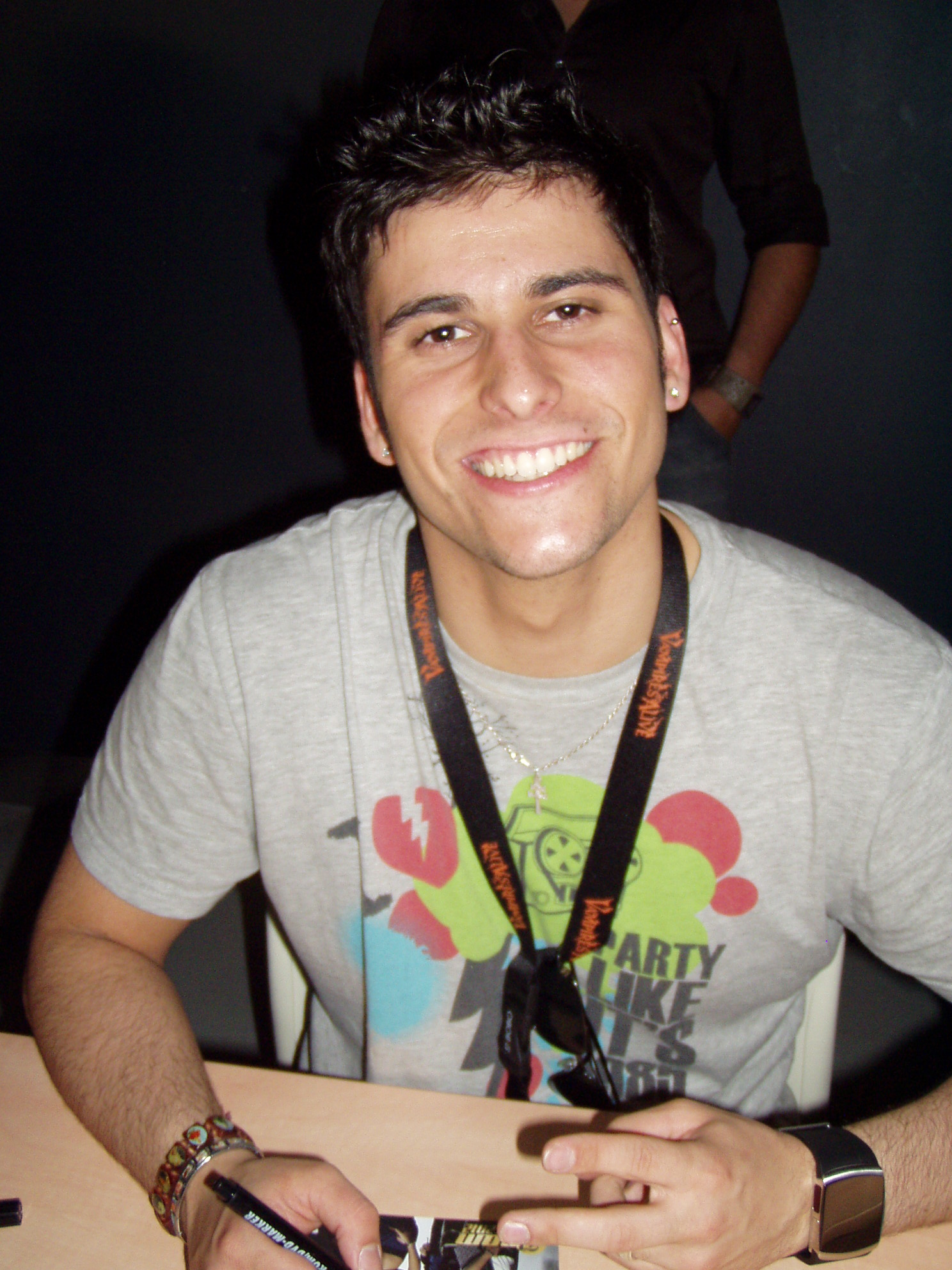
Cristóbal Gálvez Moreno

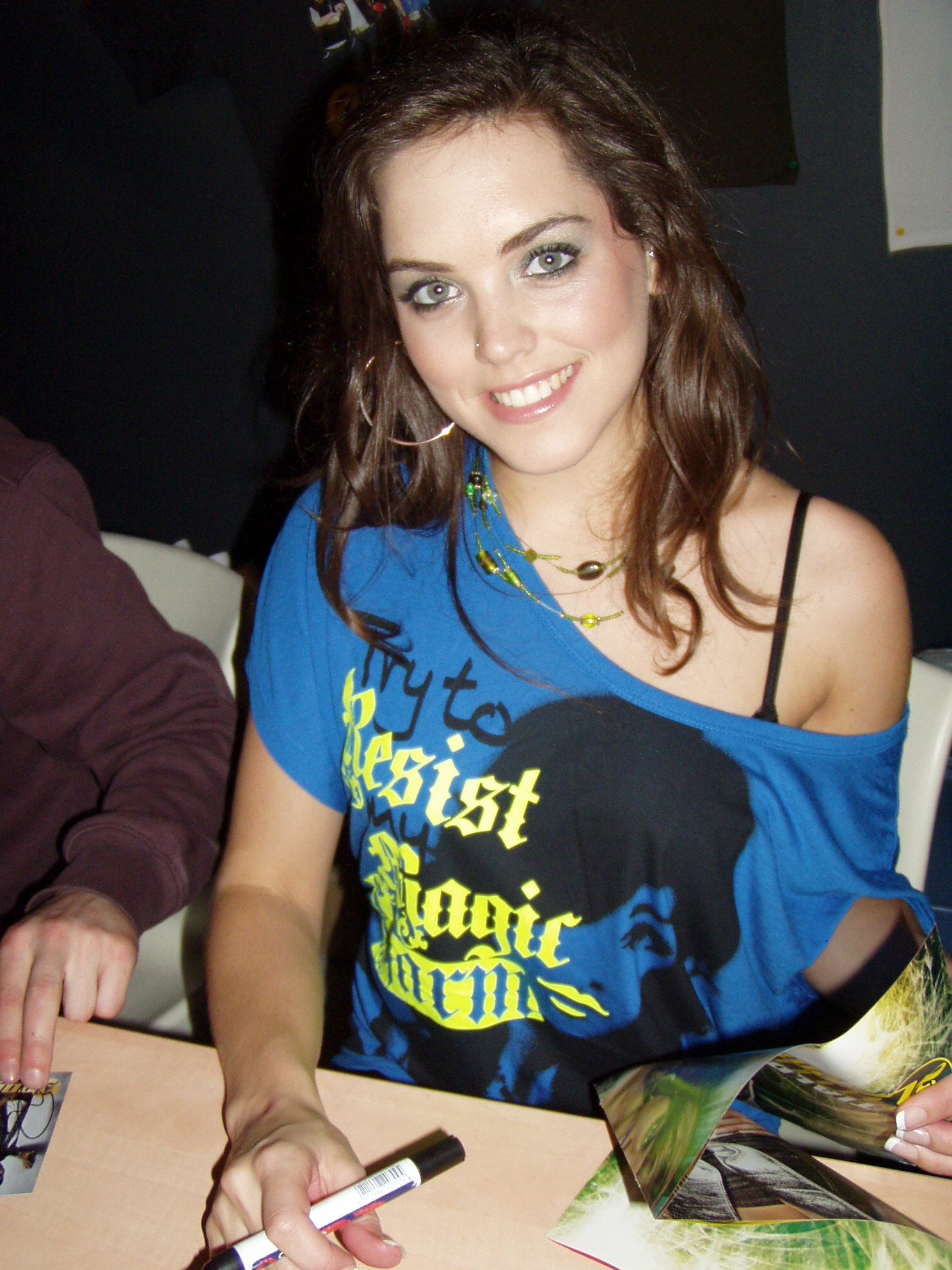
Tialda van Slogteren
