= The Bates =

German punk rock band

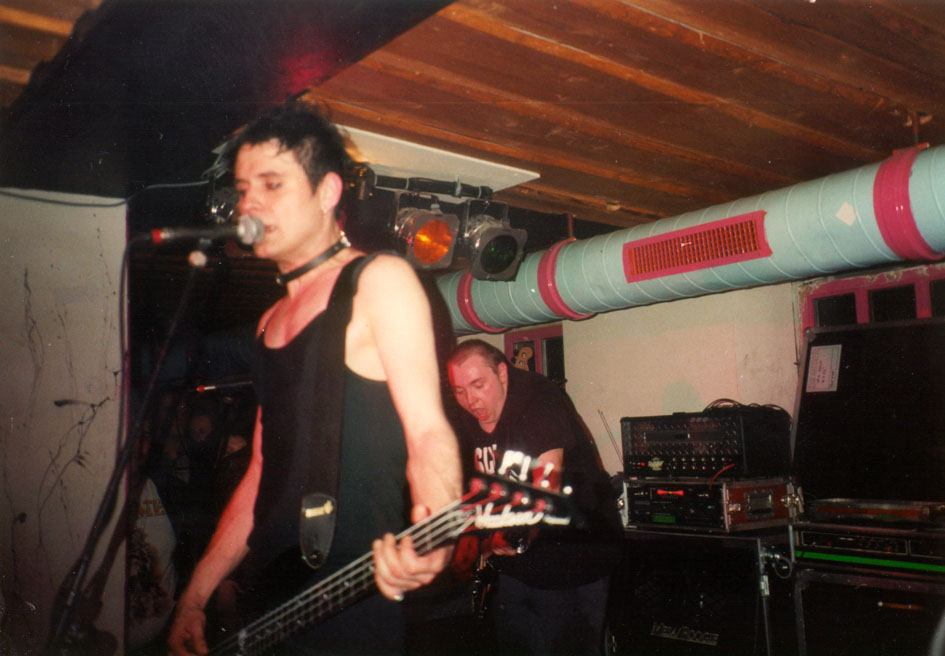
- The Bates

Background information
- Origin: Eschwege, Hesse, Germany
- Genres: Punk rock
- Years active: 1987–2001
- Members: Markus "Zimbl" Zimmer (vocals, bass; 1987–2001); Michael "Reb" Rebbig (guitar, vocals; 1991–2001); Frank "Klube" Klubescheid (drums; 1987–2001); Tillmann "Dully" Schussler (guitar; 1998–2001)
- Past members: Zimbl (deceased), Klube, Reb, Dully, Pogo, Armin Beck
- Website: www.the-bates.de

The Bates were a German punk band, founded in Eschwege, federal state of Hessen, in 1987. The name referred to the character Norman Bates from Alfred Hitchcock's 1960 film, Psycho.

The Bates were mainly known for their cover versions of songs made famous by other artists. On each of their albums they published at least two such cover songs alongside original compositions. Because the cover versions were particularly well received, The Bates released the album 2nd Skin (2000), which featured cover versions of songs taken from various genres. The Beatles ("Helter Skelter"), Rolling Stones ("Out of Time"), The Cure ("Wailing Wall"), Sailor ("Glass of Champagne"), Aneka ("Japanese Boy"), and Eiffel 65 ("Blue") were covered in the album in typical Bates style.

Amongst the Bates' most commercially successful singles was their cover version of Michael Jackson's "Billie Jean" (1995), which reached No. 10 in the Swiss charts, and No. 67 in the UK Singles Chart, gaining them the highest chart entries of their career. Some other well-received songs were the Shakespears Sister cover "Hello (Turn Your Radio On)" (1994), "A Real Cool Time" (1995), "It's Getting Dark" (1996), and "Independent Love Song" (1997). Fan favourites were "It's Getting Dark", "Say It Isn't So", "A Real Cool Time", "Bitter End", "I Don't Wanna Love You", and "Not Like You".

In 2000, the Bates disbanded. The band members reunited only briefly in December 2006 to play one concert, as a tribute to their former singer Markus "Zimbl" Zimmer, who had died earlier that year. The concert was filmed and, together with some interviews of family, friends and former acquaintances of Zimbl, made into a film: Zimbl – A Real Cool Time. A shortened version was first screened a year later on the same date as the concert.

== Discography ==
=== Studio albums ===
- 1989: No Name for the Baby
- 1990: Shake
- 1992: Psycho Junior
- 1993: The Bates
- 1995: Pleasure + Pain
- 1996: Kicks 'n' Chicks
- 1997: Punk?
- 1998: IntraVenus
- 1999: Right Here! Right Now!
- 2000: 2nd Skin

=== Live albums ===
- 1993: Unfucked: Live
- 1997: Live

=== Singles ===
- 1994: "Hello"
- 1995: "A Real Cool Time"
- 1995: "Billie Jean"
- 1995: "Say It Isn't So"
- 1996: "It's Getting Dark"
- 1996: "Poor Boy"
- 1997: "Independent Love Song"
- 1999: "Bitter End"
