= Timeless (Queensberry song) =

Single by Queensberry

from the album Chapter 3
- A-side: "Timeless"
- Released: 1 June 2012
- Recorded: 2012
- Genre: Dance-pop, electropop
- Length: 3:19 (Single Version)
- Label: Warner Bros.
- Songwriters: James Nicholas Bailey, Ryan Ogren, Chris Wallace, Ivo Moring, Chazz Gaither
- Producers: Ivo Moring, Chazz Gaither, The Blueprint

Queensberry singles chronology
"Celebrate" (2011)	"Timeless" (2012)

"Timeless" is the first single from the 3rd Studio album by the German band Queensberry.

== Formats and track listings ==
CD single

1. Timeless (Single Version) – 3:19
2. Timeless (Karaoke Version) – 3:19

Gold Edition

1. Timeless (Single Version) – 3:19
2. Timeless (Instrumental Version) – 3:19
3. Timeless (Plastic Funk Mix) – 5:42
4. Timeless (Miami Inc Mix) – 3:42

== Charts ==
German Singles Chart #90
