= Too Young (Queensberry song) =

Single by Queensberry

from the album Volume I and On My Own
- Released: 22 May 2009
- Length: 3:34
- Label: Starwatch; Cheyenne; Warner
- Songwriter(s): Eric Palmquist
- Producer(s): Kid Crazy; Pete Kirtley

Queensberry singles chronology
"I Can't Stop Feeling" / "No Smoke" (2009)	"Too Young" (2009)	"Hello (Turn Your Radio On)" (2009)

"Too Young" is a song by all-female German pop band Queensberry. It was written by Swedish composer Eric Palmqvist and recorded for the deluxe edition of the group's debut studio album Volume I (2008). Production on the track was helmed by Erik "Kid Crazy" Nyholm and Pete Kirtley. A melancholic uptempo pop song, it is built upon 1980s synthesizer sounds. Lyrically, "Too Young" has the protagonist wondering whether her broken but still longed-for relationship fell apart because of their naivety and youth.

The song was released by Starwatch Music as the band's second single on 22 May 2008. It became their first top ten hit on the German Singles Chart and ranks among the band's highest-charting singles: It peaked at number five in Germany and reached the top 20 in Austria and the top 40 in Switzerland. In support of the single, Queensberry flew to Miami, Florida to film a music video for the track with director Markus Gerwinat. "Too Young" was later also included on Queensberry's second studio album On My Own (2009).

== Critical reception ==
Beatblogger editor Andreas Krogull noted that the song discards "the musty 60s retro style" of previous releases in favor of "fresh and uncompromisingly pop" sounds. He found that "Too Young" catches "the ear as a light, pleasantly spring-like pop number; melancholy and 80s echoes are well measured. Gabby and Anto, as the two dark-haired (and undoubtedly stronger vocally) Berries are called in fan jargon, share lead vocals, while Leo and Vici only play supporting roles this time. Unfortunately, there is no real recognition value, and the pretty but harmless composition could have used a little more bite. Otherwise you can't complain: the song is right." Artur Schulz from laut.de felt that "Too Young" was "same ol'."

== Live performances ==
On 21 May 2009, "Too Young" was performed live for the first time during the finale of the fourth cycle of Germany's Next Top Model. On 22 May 2009, and 30 November 2009, the group performed the song at music event The Dome. "Too Young" was performed for the first time in the second line-up on 30 June 2010, on Wanna Challenge in Beijing, China. It has been featured on numerous other occasions, including the Radio Teddy birthday in Potsdam on 28 August and the IFA Sommergarten in Berlin on 4 September 2010.

== Music video ==
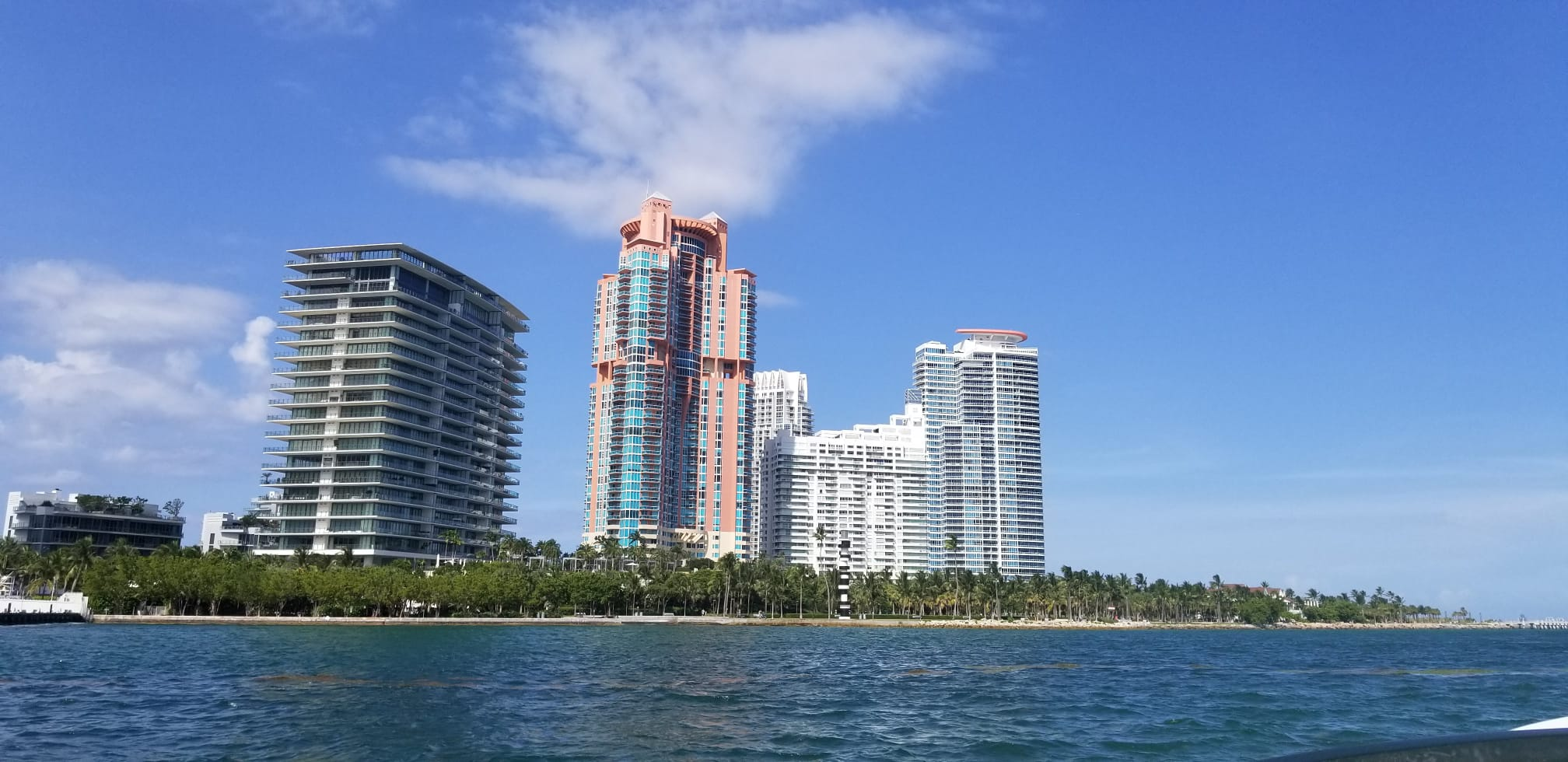
"Too Young" was filmed in various locations in Miami, including the southern extremity of South Beach.

A music video for "Too Young" was filmed in various locations in Miami, Florida in April 2009, particularly South Beach, including the South of Fifth neighborhood and the Government Cut. It was directed by Markus Gerwinat and tells a "Bonnie and Clyde type of love story," in which "a young man steals a car with his girlfriend and they go on a joyride through the city." Actors Amber Coyle and Gui Inacio portray a couple in the visuals.

The video shows a young guy stealing a car with his girlfriend, then driving through the city. They stop at a superette and while the girl distracts the salesman, her boyfriend steals some beer. They leave the shop together and then happily drive through the city again, having the "time of their life". After stopping under a bridge, they get out and share a passionate kiss. The girl finds an engagement ring in a pack of "Lucky Charms", and the couple decides to get married in a small church. The groom carries the bride out of the church, then they continue to drive through the city. At high speed, they drive past a police man, who immediately chases them. They lose the police man, who finds only an empty car remaining. The couple now walk along the beach, hand-in-hand. Throughout the video, the four Queensberry girls are shown walking along the beach, having fun. In the end, they walk past the married couple.

== Track listings ==
CD maxi single
No.	Title	Writer(s)	Producer(s)	Length
1.	"Too Young"	Eric Palmquist	Kid Crazy; Pete Kirtley	3:43
2.	"Flow"	Anthony Galatis; Mark Frisch	Kirtley; Christian Ballard; Andrew Murray	3:24

iTunes digital single
No.	Title	Writer(s)	Producer(s)	Length
1.	"Too Young"	Palmquist	Kid Crazy; Kirtley	3:43
2.	"Flow"	Galatis; Frisch	Kirtley; Ballard; Murray	3:24
3.	"Too Young" (M.A.T. Catwalk Mix)	Palmquist	Kid Crazy; Kirtley; M.A.T.^{[a]}	3:43

Notes

- ^{^[a]} denotes remix producer(s)

== Charts ==
=== Weekly charts ===
Weekly chart performance for "Too Young"
Chart (2009)	Peak position
Austria (Ö3 Austria Top 40)	12
Germany (GfK)	5
Switzerland (Schweizer Hitparade)	33

=== Year-end charts ===
Year-end chart performance for "Too Young"
Chart (2009)	Peak position
Germany (Official German Charts)	50

== Release history ==
Release dates and formats for "Too Young"
Region	Date	Format	Label	Ref
Various	22 May 2009	CD maxi single; digital download	Starwatch Music; Warner	
