= I Can't Stop Feeling =

Single by Queensberry

from the album Volume I
- Released: 20 February 2009
- Length: 3:46
- Label: Starwatch; Cheyenne; Warner
- Songwriter(s): Teemu Brunila; Kid Crazy
- Producer(s): John McLaughlin; Dave James

Queensberry singles chronology
"I Can't Stop Feeling" / "No Smoke" (2009)	"Too Young" (2009)

"I Can't Stop Feeling" is a song by German girl group Queensberry. It was written by Teemu Brunila and Erik "Kid Crazy" Nyholm and produced by John McLaughlin and Dave James for their debut album Volume I (2008). Serving as their debut, it was released as a double A-side, backed with their 2008 promotional debut single "No Smoke", on 20 February 2009. The ballad reached the top thirty of the German Singles Chart.

== Music video ==
A music video for "I Can't Stop Feeling" was directed by Oliver Sommer and produced by AVA Studios.

== Track listings ==
CD maxi single
No.	Title	Writer(s)	Producer(s)	Length
1.	"I Can't Stop Feeling"	Teemu Brunila; Kid Crazy	John McLaughlin; Dave James	3:47
2.	"No Smoke"	McLaughlin; James; Alan Ross	McLaughlin; James	3:20
3.	"Dance"	Shaznay Lewis; Rick Nowels; Wayne Rodrigues	Henrik Menzel; Tommy "Petone" Peters	3:14
4.	"I Can't Stop Feeling" (instrumental)	Brunila; Crazy	McLaughlin; James	3:46

== Charts ==
Weekly chart performance for "I Can't Stop Feeling"
Chart (2009)	Peak position
Austria (Ö3 Austria Top 40)	54
Germany (GfK)	23
Switzerland (Schweizer Hitparade)	40
