= Popstars Dance Company =

German dance team

The Popstars Dance Company
- The Popstars Dance Company at "The Dome"

Background information
- Also known as: Room 2012
- Origin: Germany
- Genres: Pop, hip hop
- Years active: 2007–2008
- Label: Popstars
- Members: Aziz Kruezi; Raik Preetz; Viktoria "Vika" Ljascenko; Darren Drake Baldric; Armin "Shorty" Nezirevic

Popstars Dance Company is a dance team from Germany. Each of its five members achieved individual success before joining in 2007. The Popstars Dance Company was also featured on Popstars Germany and was the winning band during the finale.

== Beginning ==
In 2007 season of Popstars the producers were looking for a dancing group to support the singers on stage.

=== Popstars ===
Popstars Dance Company is a German dance group, that was cast in the sixth season of Popstars, simultaneously with the band Room2012. This is the first time where other talents were cast in Popstars. The dancers had to show innovative dance styles and perform together with the singers although they often had training without them. The final of the dancers was held on 8 November 2007, almost a month before the singers of Room2012 were announced (on 6 December).

== Members ==
=== Aziz Kruezi ===
Aziz Kruezi started dancing for Sarah Connor.

=== Raik Preetz ===
Raik Preetz started working as a DJ and dancing master. He set up the Danceschool “German Dance Art” in Brunswick.

=== Vika Ljascenko ===
Born 5 January 1988, Vika grew up in Germany. She auditioned in Offenbach for a spot in the Popstars Dance Company along with her best friend Lina. Vika Ljascenko started working as dancing master after the split.

=== Darren Drake Baldric ===
Darren Drake Baldric set up a dance school.

=== Armin "Shorty" Nezirevic ===
Armin "Shorty" Nezirevic started working with Detlef "D!" Soost.

== Post-Popstars ==
As a crew they have appeared in Room 2012's "Naughty but Nice" music video in 2008. The song was presented at The Dome 45 by the groups. In the mid of December in 2007 they were starting a club tour for a month along with Room 2012. On 31 December 2007, they performed at the Brandenburg Gate Sylvester Party in front of million people. In 2008 they decided that they will no longer be performing together.
