= Hello (Turn Your Radio On) =

1992 single by Shakespears Sister

Single by Shakespears Sister

from the album Hormonally Yours
- B-side: "Stay" (remix)
- Released: 26 October 1992
- Genre: Rock
- Length: 4:05 (album version); 4:23 (7-inch version)
- Label: London
- Songwriters: Siobhan Fahey; Marcella Detroit; Jean Guiot
- Producers: Alan Moulder; Shakespears Sister

Shakespears Sister singles chronology
| "I Don't Care" (1992) | "Hello (Turn Your Radio On)" (1992) | "My 16th Apology" (1993) |

Music video
- "Hello (Turn Your Radio On)" on YouTube

"Hello (Turn Your Radio On)" is a song by British-based pop duo Shakespears Sister, and was released in October 1992 by London Records as the fourth single from their second album, Hormonally Yours (1992). The single peaked at number 14 and spent six weeks on the UK Singles Chart. Internationally, the single peaked within the top 40 in Germany, Ireland, the Netherlands, Sweden, and Switzerland.

== Background ==
The single was released in the UK on 26 October 1992. The album version of the song was remixed for its single release, featuring more bass and with drums added. The single version is also slightly extended, with a repeat of the chorus towards the end of the song. The single sleeve artwork was created by Laurence Dunmore, with photography by Derek Ridgers.

== Critical reception ==
Tom Demalon from AllMusic described the song as a "stellar glam-tinged ballad with a dreamy chorus". Larry Flick from Billboard magazine called it a "Beatles-esque rock ballad". He added: "A soft, rolling piano line is surrounded by deep alto harmonies and nimble guitars. Booming, swaying, and completely memorable chorus is icing on the cake." The Daily Vault's Michael R. Smith stated in his album review that "the spellbinding grand finale of 'Hello (Turn Your Radio On)' is just icing on the cake." A reviewer from the Liverpool Echo wrote: "Songs that mention the radio always do well on the radio. It's because DJs are so big-headed. But this one – a re-mixed track from the Hormonally Yours album – does sound good on radio." Pan-European magazine Music & Media commented: "Hello out there in radio land, stay for a while for another ballad by the hippest sisters around." Pop Rescue said it is a "great" track.

== Music video ==
The accompanying music video for "Hello (Turn Your Radio On)" was directed by British director Sophie Muller and is made in black-and-white as an old movie. It depicts the duo performing inside what appears to be a closet that is being opened in the beginning and closed at the end of the video.

== Track listings ==
- 7-inch single and cassette
1. "Hello (Turn Your Radio On)" (7-inch version) — 4:24
2. "Stay" (André Betts remix) — 4:28
- UK limited-edition CD single
1. "Hello (Turn Your Radio On)" (7-inch version) — 4:23
2. "Hello (Turn Your Radio On)" (alternative piano version) — 4:23
3. "Hello (Turn Your Radio On)" (album version) — 4:06
4. "Stay" (André Betts remix) — 3:49
- UK CD single
1. "Hello (Turn Your Radio On)" — 4:24
2. "Black Sky" (Dub Extravaganza Part 2) — 10:39
3. "Goodbye Cruel World" (BTO remix) — 7:06
4. "Stay (André Betts 12-inch remix) — 4:28
- European and Australasian CD single
1. "Hello (Turn Your Radio On)" (7-inch version) — 4:23
2. "Hello (Turn Your Radio On)" (alternative piano version) — 4:23
3. "Goodbye Cruel World" (BTO remix) — 7:06
4. "Stay" (André Betts remix) — 3:49

== Charts ==
=== Weekly charts ===
| Chart (1992–1993) | Peak position |
|---|---|
| Australia (ARIA) | 97 |
| Europe (Eurochart Hot 100) | 48 |
| Germany (GfK) | 12 |
| Ireland (IRMA) | 27 |
| Netherlands (Dutch Top 40) | 35 |
| Netherlands (Single Top 100) | 33 |
| New Zealand (Recorded Music NZ) | 43 |
| Sweden (Sverigetopplistan) | 20 |
| Switzerland (Schweizer Hitparade) | 9 |
| UK Singles (Official Charts) | 14 |
| UK Airplay (Music Week) | 5 |

=== Year-end charts ===
| Chart (1993) | Position |
|---|---|
| Germany (Media Control) | 50 |
| Switzerland (Schweizer Hitparade) | 39 |

== Release history ==
| Region | Date | Format(s) | Label(s) | Ref. |
|---|---|---|---|---|
| United Kingdom | 26 October 1992 | 7-inch vinyl; CD; cassette | London | |
| Australia | 23 November 1992 | CD; cassette | London | |

== The Bates version ==
"Hello"

Single by the Bates

from the album The Bates
- B-side: "All in All"
- Released: 1994
- Length: 3:21
- Label: Virgin
- Songwriters: Siobhan Fahey; Marcella Detroit; Jean Guiot

The Bates singles chronology
| "Hello" (1994) | "A Real Cool Time" (1994) |

"Hello (Turn Your Radio On)" was covered by German punk band the Bates, and was released as the group's lead single in 1994.

=== Track listing ===
- CD single
1. "Hello" – 3:21
2. "All in All" – 2:28
3. "It's a Heartache" (Punch in the Face demo mix) – 1:52
4. "Hello" (Punch in the Face demo mix) – 3:14
5. "Worse Than the Devil" (Punch in the Face demo mix) – 1:51

== Queensberry version ==
"Hello (Turn Your Radio On)"

Single by Queensberry

from the album On My Own
- Released: 23 October 2009
- Length: 3:15
- Label: Starwatch; Cheyenne; Warner
- Songwriters: Siobhan Fahey; Marcella Detroit; Jean Guiot
- Producer: Philip Larsen

Queensberry singles chronology
| "Too Young" (2009) | "Hello (Turn Your Radio On)" (2009) | "The Song" (2009) |

"Hello (Turn Your Radio On)" was covered by German girl group Queensberry, and released as the lead single from the band's second studio album On My Own in October 2009.

=== Track listing ===
CD maxi single
| No. | Title | Writer(s) | Producer(s) | Length |
|---|---|---|---|---|
| 1. | "Hello (Turn Your Radio On)" | Siobhan Fahey; David A. Stewart; Marcella Detroit | Philip Larsen | 3:18 |
| 2. | "Welcome to My World" | Andrew Bojanic; Elizabeth Hooper; Jim Marr; Wendy Page | Larsen | 3:44 |

=== Weekly charts ===
Weekly chart performance for "Hello (Turn Your Radio On)"
| Chart (2009) | Peak position |
|---|---|
| Austria (Ö3 Austria Top 40) | 12 |
| Germany (GfK) | 4 |
| Switzerland (Schweizer Hitparade) | 29 |

=== Year-end charts ===
Year-end chart performance for "Hello (Turn Your Radio On)"
| Chart (2009) | Position |
|---|---|
| Germany (Media Control GfK) | 88 |
