= Kate Hall (singer) =

English and Danish singer (born 1983)

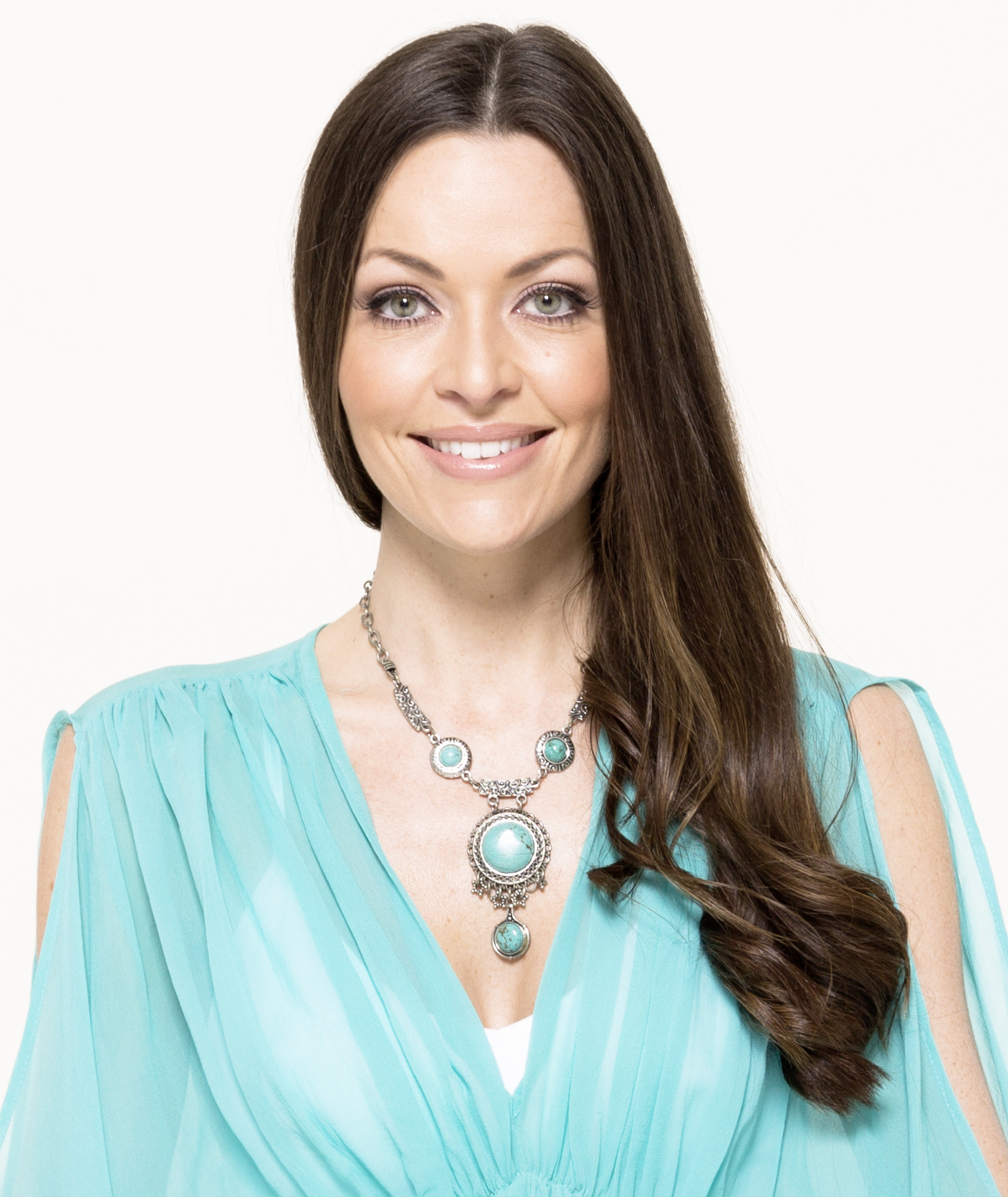
- Hall in 2016
- Born: 21 May 1983 (age 43); Harwich, England
- Citizenship: United Kingdom; Danmark
- Occupations: Singer; composer
- Years active: 2005–present
- Musical career
- Origin: Germany
- Genres: Pop; Electronic
- Instruments: Vocals; Piano
- Labels: Universal; King Size; 313 Music; Columbia; Rosekick Records

Kate Hall (born 21 May 1983) is a British and Danish singer, composer presenter and vocal coach based in Germany.

== Biography ==
Hall was born in Harwich, Essex, to an English mother and a Danish father and moved to Allerød at the age of three. As a child, she received lessons in singing, piano and dancing. When she was twelve years old, she was accepted into the Danish Radio Girls' choir. A year later, she made studio recordings for Postman Pat. She appeared as a television presenter in The Voice TV Danmark, and reached the final of the Danish edition of Popstars where she finished third.

After being discovered by the German music producer, Alex Christensen, she reached the German charts with the single "Is There Anybody Out There?" in June 2005.

Hall was engaged to German singer Ben, and in 2007 released four duet singles, "Bedingungslos", "Du bist wie Musik", "Ich lieb dich immer noch so", and "Zwei Herzen" with him. In November 2008, she announced that the engagement had ended, after which she continued as a solo singer.

She was a vocal coach in the seventh and tenth series of the German edition of Popstars. In 2009, Hall married German dancer Detlef D! Soost, whom she met during her time at Popstars.

In January 2013, Hall was announced as one of the participants in the 2013 Danish National Song Contest, the winner of which would represent Denmark in the Eurovision Song Contest.

== Discography ==
=== Albums ===
Title	Details
Von beiden Seiten	Release: April 25, 2008; Label: Columbia Records; Formats: CD, digital download
Heaven Around the Corner	Released: November 27, 2009; Label: Universal; Formats: CD, digital download
