= First Shot (album) =

Studio album by Some & Any
- Released: December 18, 2009
- Recorded: November–December 2009
- Genres: Pop, rock, dance-pop
- Length: 42:18
- Label: Warner Music

Singles from First Shot
- 1. "Last Man Standing" Released: December 11, 2009

First Shot is the only studio album by German pop-duo Some & Any, released by Warner Music on 18 December 2009 in German-speaking Europe, following the band's formation on German television casting-show Popstars Du & Ich. The album includes the band's debut single "Last Man Standing", songs performed by former contestants during the show, songs written by and featuring Michelle Leonard and songs produced by Alex Christensen.

== Track listing ==
The album includes following songs.

Standard listing
No.	Title	Writer(s)	Producer(s)	Length
1.	"Last Man Standing"	Lina Eriksson	Pete Kirtley JIANT, Christian Ballard, Andrew Murray	3:26
2.	"Heartbreaker"	Kid Crazy	Philip Larsen	3:45
3.	"Love Is The Answer"	Alex Christensen, Peter Könemann	Alex Christensen	3:30
4.	"If Only"	Shaznay Lewis, Fredrik Ödesjö, Andreas Levander	Philip Larsen	3:33
5.	"Together Alone"	Kiko Masbaum, Michelle Leonard, Janet Grogan	Pete Kirtley JIANT, Christian Ballard, Andrew Murray	3:47
6.	"A Little Bit Of Love"	Lina Eriksson	Pete Kirtley JIANT, Christian Ballard, Andrew Murray	4:13
7.	"Story To Tell"	Alex Geringas, Erik Nyholm, Dimitri Ehrlich	Alex Christensen	4:02
8.	"Hijack My Heart"	Robin Felder, Roman Camenzind, Fred Herrmann	Alex Christensen	3:47
9.	"Electrify Me"	Michelle Leonard, MachoPsycho, Mark Smith	Philip Larsen	3:25
10.	"Too Perfect"	Hanne Sorvaag, Claudio Pagonis, Tobias Röger	Alex Christensen	3:52
11.	"I Wish You Knew"	Alexander Komlew, Nalle Ahlstedt, Henri Lanz, Will Rappaport (GoodWill & MGI)	Alex Christensen	4:02
12.	"Mechanical Heart (feat. Michelle Leonard)"	Michelle Leonard, Aytug Gün, Dagmara Woszczek, Daniel Dausner, Elif Demirezer, Esra Aksoy, Jana Barske, Leonardo Ritzmann, Manuela Härle, Niklas Dennin, Valentina Lindlahr, Vanessa Meisinger	Pete Kirtley JIANT, Christian Ballard, Andrew Murray	2:56
13.	"Don't Look Back (Bonus Track)"	Tommy Lee James, Stuart Crichton	Philip Larsen	3:24
