= Queensberry (band) =

German girl band (2008–2013)

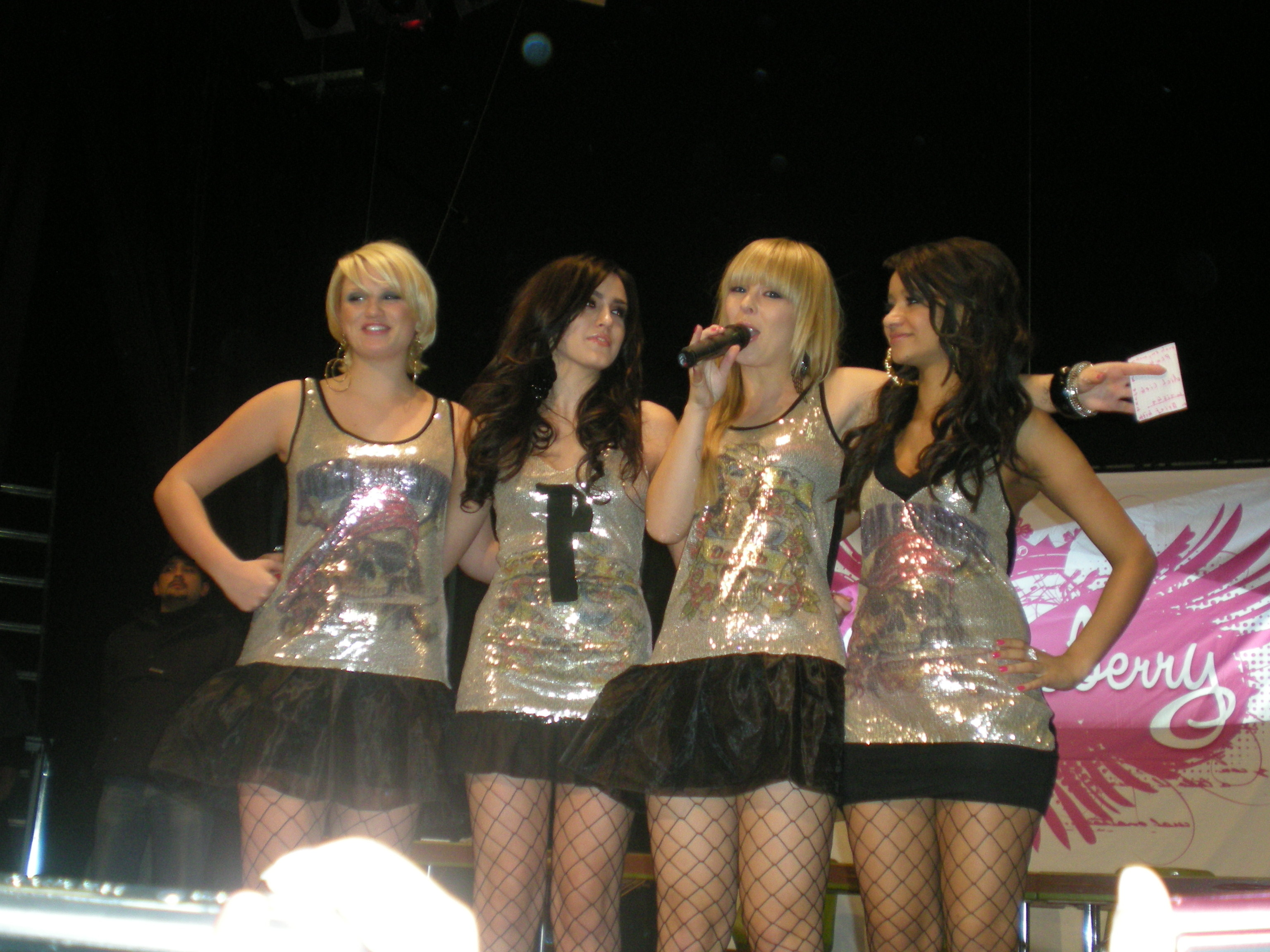
- Queensberry original quartet (2008)

Background information
- Origin: Germany
- Genres: Pop, R&B, dance-pop
- Years active: 2008–2013
- Label: Warner Music (2008–2010)
- Past members: Gabriella De Almeida Rinne; Leonore Bartsch; Antonella Trapani; Victoria Ulbrich; Selina Herrero; Ronja Hilbig
- Website: www.queensberry.de

Queensberry was an all-female German pop group founded in late 2008. Formed during the seventh season of the television talent show Popstars, Popstars – Just 4 Girls, the original line-up consisted of singers Leonore Bartsch (Leo), Gabriella De Almeida Rinne (Gabby), Antonella Trapani (Anto), and Victoria Ulbrich (Vici). In July 2010, it was announced that both Antonella and Victoria had left the group, to be replaced by new members, Selina Herrero and Ronja Hilbig.

The band's debut album Volume I was released in December 2008 and reached gold status in Germany in January 2009. It produced two singles, "No Smoke" and "I Can't Stop Feeling", both becoming top thirty successes in the charts. In February 2008, Queensberry served as the opening act for the Pussycat Dolls's Doll Domination Tour in selected European countries. In November 2009, the second studio album On My Own was released. For the soundtrack of the film Alvin and the Chipmunks: The Squeakquel, Queensberry recorded "The Song" with The Chipettes in December 2009, in addition to voicing the characters in the German-dubbed version of the film and later reprising their roles in the dub of its successor, 2011's Chipwrecked.

== History ==
=== Formation on Popstars ===
The Queensberry members were selected on the ProSieben channel's seventh installment of the Popstars series, entitled Popstars – Just 4 Girls, which set about producing a four-piece girl group, following the initial success of previous all-female Popstars acts such as No Angels (2000) and Monrose (2006). No stranger to Popstars, Leonore Bartsch, who originates from Cologne, had already taken part in the Monrose season and was the last contestant to leave before the finale. In June and July 2008, over 2,300 hopefuls turned up to open auditions in Dortmund, Dresden, Hamburg and Rust which required both singing and dancing experience. The judges consisted of dancer and choreographer Detlef Soost, Dutch singer Loona and German rapper Sido. Danish singer Kate Hall served as this season's vocal coach.

After numerous elimination rounds, sixteen candidates flew to Sharm El Sheik, Egypt, where they intensified their training in singing, dancing, and fitness. In the end, twelve girls made it into the band house near Munich, of which six started work on the band's debut album. Beforehand, the top eight contestants, as Popstars – Just 4 Girls, released the single I Believe In X-Mas promoted with a music video. Leo, German-Brazilian Gabriella De Almeida Rinne, who originates from Berlin, and Victoria Ulbrich, all managed to make it into the Queensberry line-up prior to the season's live finale in Hilversum, Netherlands, with all of them having won special stage performances, even though Victoria had had to go into hiatus for four weeks due to her mother's sudden death. Fourth member, Swiss-born, German-Italian, Antonella, was not announced until 18 December, when the show was resumed, based on her having sold most of her version of the group's debut album Volume I (which had been released in three different versions, a week prior to the finale, and featuring one finalist each) and her winning a public televoting over fellow campaigners Patricia Ivanauskas and Katharina Kobert (KayKay). Ironically, although each of the Queensberry girls had already performed together with all of their future bandmates (varying from duets to quartets), at some point throughout the season, it had never happened that all four of them made up one working group together. However, a couple of times, three of the future band members were featured in one quartet, but then with either Leo or Antonella not being part of it.

=== 2008/2009: Volume 1 and On My Own ===
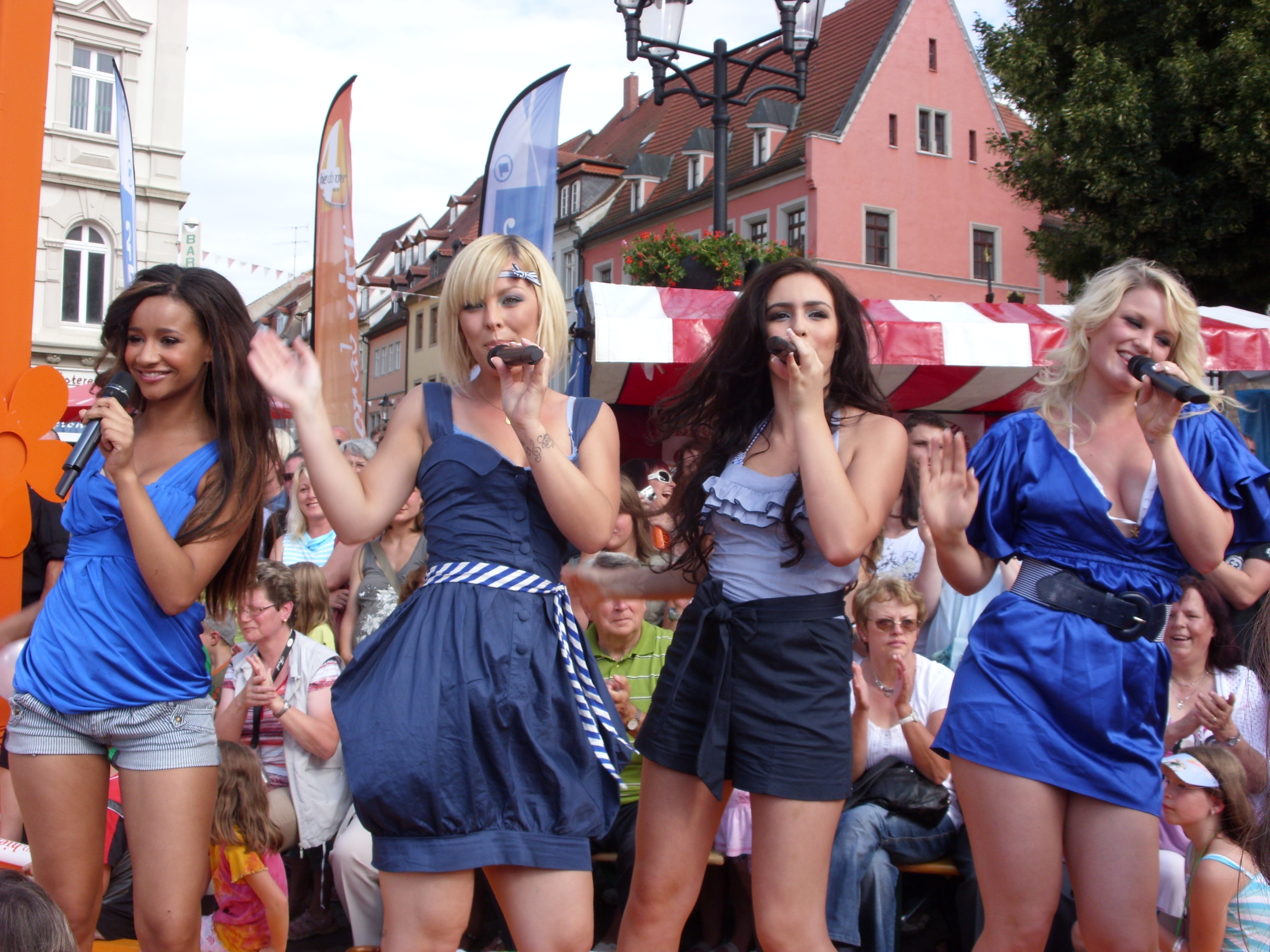
Queensberry performing with the original line-up in 2009. From left to right: Gabriella De Almeida Rinne, Leonore Bartsch, Antonella Trapani & Victoria Ulbrich.

With the final members of the group in place, the quartet signed a recording contract with Warner Music Group sub-label Starwatch Music. In January 2009, the album Volume I was certified gold by the IFPI, and in February, the band released their first main single, a double A-single consisting of the ballad I Can't Stop Feeling and their promotional song No Smoke - a cover version of the 2008 record by Canadian Idol winner Eva Avila. The single has also been covered by Nicki French. The song reached a moderate number 23 on the German singles chart, the lowest-chart peak for any Popstars winner's debut single, while No Smoke made it to the top thirty in Switzerland based on downloads only. In February 2009, the band served as the official opening act of The Pussycat Dolls' Doll Domination Tour in selected European countries, including Austria, Germany and the Netherlands. In June the same year, a deluxe edition of Volume I was released featuring additional tracks (including the Too Young single) and remixes.

On 6 May 2009, it was announced that the group was working on its second studio album. The track list included their previous summer song-single called Too Young, the second album's first single Hello (Turn Your Radio On) and one song, which was performed live by former Popstars – Just 4 Girls participant Patricia, called Scandalous. The album was released on 6 November 2009, with its promotional single Hello (Turn Your Radio On) released on 23 October 2009. This album was planned to be the band's first US album. On 18 June 2010, the girls released two new songs as the soundtrack for the Hanni und Nanni movie, while their record contract with Warner Music in Germany was discontinued.

=== 2010–2013: Line-up changes, Chapter 3 and disbandment ===
On 7 July 2010, following speculation surrounding Trapani’s prolonged absence due to illness, Bartsch and Almeida Rinne announced on the group's official website that both Trapani and Ulbrich had departed from the group. Although the band members denied that internal disputes had been the cause of the departures, initial explanations referred to increasing pressure and differing views regarding the creative process as contributing factors. In the years that followed, it became apparent that some members had also voiced growing dissatisfaction with the band's management, with Trapani in particular reportedly advocating for a change in management. However, the record label reportedly rejected the possibility of appointing a new manager, which ultimately played a role in the members' decisions to leave the band.

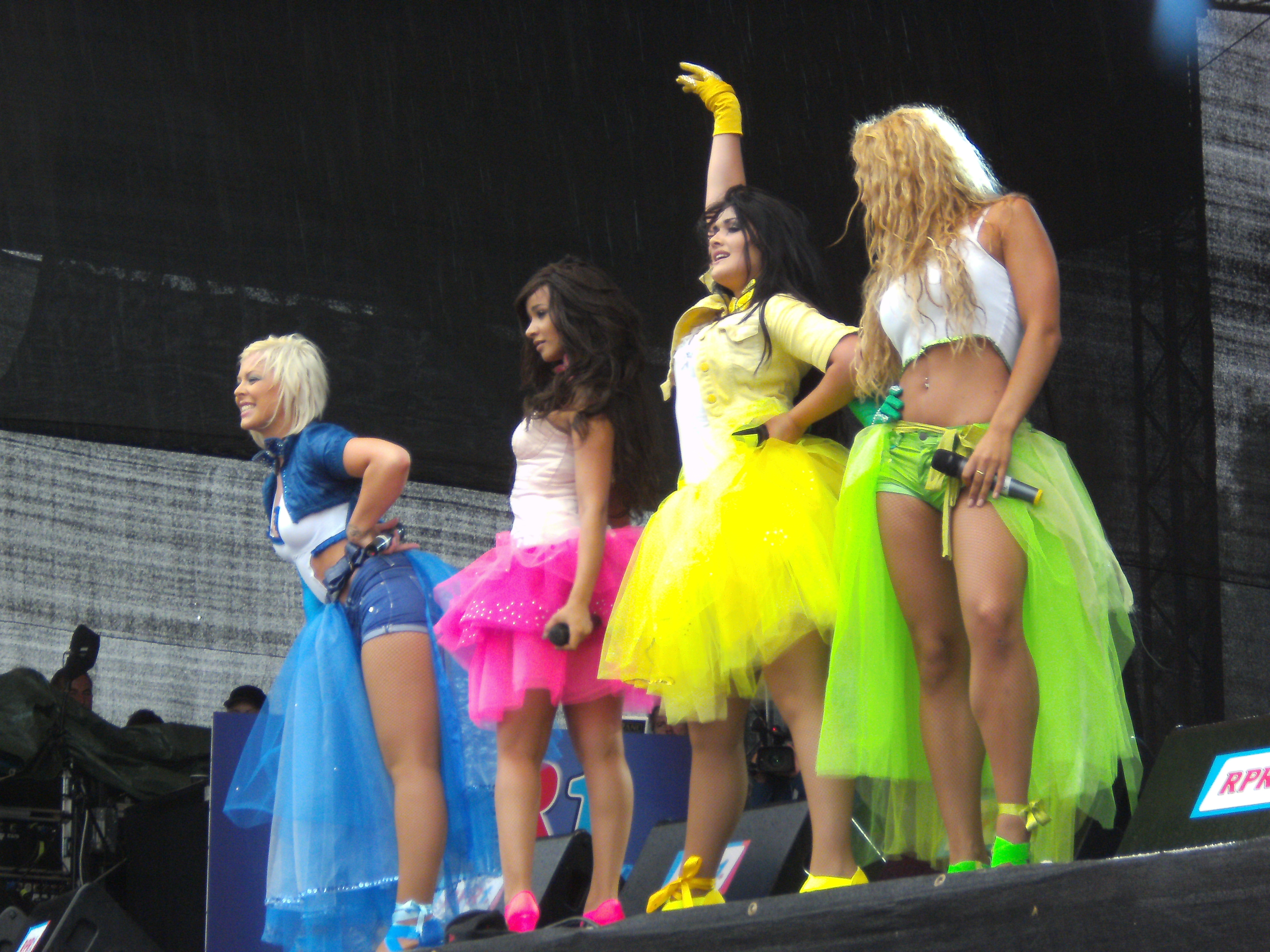
Queensberry during their Pink Chocolate Tour (2011)

Bartsch and Almeida Rinne recruited Selina Herrero, with whom Bartsch had previously collaborated on side projects, and Ronja Hilbig, a former member of Die Lollipops, to replace their former bandmates. Their first appearance in the new lineup took place on 15 July 2010 on VIVA Live. Almost simultaneously, Cheyenne Records decided to drop the group, resulting in the loss of their recording contract. The group made plans to shoot a reality show called A Day in the Life of Queensberry to be shown all over the US. In October 2010, the group recorded its earlier single I Can't Stop Feeling in Spanish as Yo No Puedo Vivir Sin Ti. The song, written by Teemu Brunila and Kid Crazy, and adapted for Spanish by José Valdes, was first performed on VIVA Live. On 3 December 2010, Queensberry announced it would make a label change and release an album in 2011. During spring and summer of 2011, the group performed throughout Germany on their Pink Chocolate Tour.

The girls guest star on the album of German rapper Kitty Kat, and featured on a single called "No Time for Suckers". In April 2012, it was announced that Selina Herrero left the band and went back to school. The remaining members released their third album, Chapter 3, as a trio on 22 June 2012. The first single of the album, Timeless, was released on 1 June 2012. Both album and single charted very low in the German Charts at 90 and 91 respectively. Despite failing at repeating their former successes, a music video for the second single Girl Like Me was shot. The single was released on 31 August 2012 and became the first single of the group that failed to chart within the German Top 100.

In August 2012, band member Leo had to drop out from several scheduled concerts of the band due to health issues. Therefore, De Almeida Rinne and Hilbig did several shows as a duo. In October 2012, Leo announced on her official website, that she has left the band. The remaining two members then decided to put future plans for the band on hold to focus on solo projects. In summer 2013 however, it came into the open that they had decided not to perform any longer together.

== Discography ==
- 2008: Volume I
- 2009: On My Own
- 2012: Chapter 3

== Tours ==
- 2012: Candy Couture Tour (23 May – 28 July)
- 2011: Pink Chocolate Tour (17 June – 3 September)
- 2010: The Queensberry Show (4 September 2010 – 10 October 2010)

As supporting act

- 2009: The Pussycat Dolls: Doll Domination Tour (9–23 February 2009)

== Awards and nominations ==
=== Results ===
| Year | Award | Category | Work | Result |
|---|---|---|---|---|
| 2009 | Viva Comet | Best Newcomer | Themself | Nominated |
| 2010 | Viva Comet | Best Band | Themself | Nominated |

== See also ==
- Girl group
- Popstars
