= Die Lollipops =

Defunct German children's band

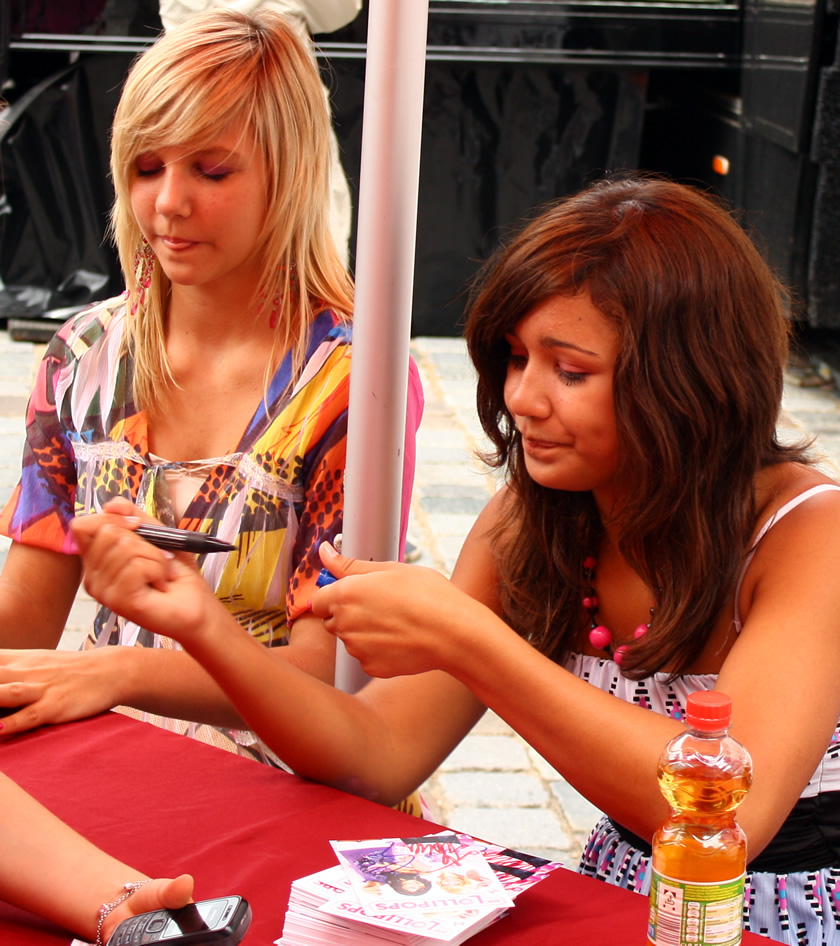
Susi and Fiona, Toggo Tour 2009

Die Lollipops was a children's band which formed in Germany in the summer of 2000 under the Edelkids label, a subsidiary of Edel Music.

== Music ==
Their music can be divided into three basic types:

- Traditional children's songs, whether native or international;
- Covers, or songs in which the melody is borrowed from a popular song (often from the English-speaking world) but the lyrics are unrelated; and
- Original songs invented by the group. This accounts for the largest number of songs, especially in the more recent releases.

In all cases, the lyrics in the songs are upbeat and playful, and their music has been likened to bubblegum pop.

== History ==
Die is German for "the" (plural); Lollipops is a loanword from English. The most common German word for lollipop is Lutscher, but like its English counterpart "sucker", it has come to be supplemented in modern times by Lollipop. The band debuted in July 2000 with a self-titled album which contains what are today many of their most famous songs. Since then, they have released new CDs, videos, and audiobooks at the rate of about two per year. As of 2005, their label had sold more than 1.5 million of their CDs and videos, of which 8 made it to gold and one platinum. Note that the meanings of the terms platinum and gold are different for different countries: in Germany gold signifies 100,000 sales and platinum 200,000.

The cast of the Lollipops changes every few years in order that they maintain girls between the ages of about 11 and 16 as singers. Most of the time, there are two lead singers with occasional accompaniments by other singers who are not named; for a short time there were three main singers. The current duet started recording in late 2007 with Susi and Fiona (then 12 and 11 years old respectively), and released an album called Einfach tierisch in March 2008. Previously the band had used two girls named Maria and Maike, who had been in the band since March 2005. Before that, Joanna Strand and Ronja Hilbig had been in the band. Hilbig, who joined the band in 2003, had played the role of Nala in Der König der Löwen, the German-language version of the musical, The Lion King, and attended Alexander-von-Humboldt-Gymnasium, Hamburg, where she was a member of the Schülerrat and where she completed her abitur. In 2010, Hilbig joined Queensberry. People who have worked behind the scenes include Peter Hoffmann, the producer at the group's inception, and Klaus Büchner, founder of Torfrock and also the composer of many of the Lollipops' earlier songs.

== Discography ==
- 2000: Die Lollipops
- 2000: Winterwunderland
- 2001: Komm wir geh'n ins Kino
- 2001: Sing mit Uns
- 2001: Hitzefrei
- 2002: Einmal um die Ganze Welt
- 2003: Freunde Fürs Leben
- 2004: Tanzen, Lachen, Party machen
- 2004: Wir Feiern
- 2004: Wünsch Dir Was!
- 2005: Für Immer Ferien
- 2005: Wir Wolln Spass
- 2006: Reiterferien sind der Hit!
- 2007: Party, Popcorn, Polonaise!
- 2007: Zusammen sind wir Doppelt Stark
- 2008: Einfach Tierisch
- 2009: Immer in Bewegung
- 2010: Jetzt geht's ab
