= Popstars – Just 4 Girls =

- Created by: Jonathan Dowling
- Starring: Monrose; Detlef "D!" Soost; Loona; Sido
- Country of origin: Germany
- No. of episodes: 17

Production
- Camera setup: Multi-camera
- Running time: 100 minutes

Original release
- Network: ProSieben
- Release: 28 August – 18 December 2008

Related
- Popstars – On Stage; Popstars: Du & Ich

Popstars – Just 4 Girls is the seventh season of Popstars, a German reality TV show, in which young aspiring female singers/dancers compete in order to claim a place in the next girl group. The contestants, who also live together during the course of the show, are groomed and judged by the choreographer Detlef D! Soost, and are judged on their vocal and dancing ability by rapper Sido and singer Loona. The grand prize for the four winners is a record deal with Warner Music Group as well as the opportunity to join The Pussycat Dolls on their next world tour. This is the format for the seventh season, focusing mostly on female dancers/singers, looking for fame in the music industry.

The show opened in August 2008. Leonore Bartsch, who failed to qualify for the finale of the 2006 season of Popstars, was the first band member to be announced on 20 November 2008. The finale was held one week before Christmas, concluding with the announcement of the fourth band member of the group Queensberry.

== Elimination's call-out order ==
Judges' call-out order
Order	Episodes													
Order	5	6	7	8	9	10	11	12	13	14	15	16	17	
01	Diyana	Leo	Nina	Leo	KayKay^{1}	Patricia^{2}	Diyana	Leo	KayKay^{3}	Vici^{3}	Lea	Anto	Anto	Anto
02	Anto	Patricia	Virginia	Patricia	Lea	Nina^{2}	Vici^{1}	Anto	Diyana	KayKay	Diyana	Patricia	Patricia	Patricia
03	Gabby	Lea	Vici	Diyana	Leo	Sheila^{2}	Leo	KayKay	Patricia^{3}	Lea^{3}	Anto	KayKay	KayKay	
04	Anja	Jill	Lea	Anto	Nina	Gabby^{2}	Anto	Diyana	Gabby^{3}	Annemarie	KayKay	Lea		
05	Taschira	Diyana	Leo	Latoya	Patricia	Jill	Jill	Annemarie	Vici	Patricia^{3}	Patricia			
06	Marcella	Nina	Diyana	Lea	Sheila^{1}	Leo	Lea	Patricia	Annemarie	Diyana	Gabby^{4}			
07	Nina	Latoya	Jill	Nina	Ina	Diyana	Gabby	Gabby	Anto	Gabby				
08	Vici	Ina	Anto	Virginia	Annemarie^{1}	Virginia	Patricia	Vici	Ina	Anto^{3}				
09	Desiree	Virginia	Ina	Jill	Virginia	Annemarie	Nina	Lea	Leo^{3}					
10	Karmina	Laura	Roya	Ina	Gabby	KayKay	KayKay	Ina	Lea					
11	Leo	Marcella	Latoya	Gabby	Jill	Ina	Ina	Jill						
12	Latoya	Vici	Gabby	Vici	Christin^{1}	Lea	Annemarie							
13	Laura	Roya^{1}	Patricia	Roya	Anto	Anto	Sheila							
14	Roya	Gabby			Diyana									
15	Virginia	Anto												
16	Jill	Desiree												
17	Catherine	Anja												
18	Ina													
19	Patricia													
20	Lea													
21	Ivana													
Notes: 1. The contestant was brought back to the show after being eliminated; 2. The contestant was band-leader but not safe from elimination; 3. The contestant had the chance to become a groupmember this week; 4. The contestant became a groupmember the next week

The contestant was eliminated
The contestant was eliminated outside of the judging panel
The contestant won the reward challenge
The contestant won the reward challenge, but was eliminated
The contestant quit the competition
The contestant was band-leader and as such is safe from elimination
The contestant was band-leader and as such is safe from elimination and won the reward challenge
The contestants were safe from elimination and not called by their names
The contestant won the competition
