= Starwatch Music =

Starwatch Entertainment is a German music label founded by ProSiebenSat.1 Media in spring 2005. The company has headquarters is in Unterföhring, near Munich. From 2009 onwards the company expanded its operations from label activities to music cooperation, live-entertainment business, artist management and ticketing. The ticketing platform Tickethall.de is a subsidiary of Starwatch Entertainment.

Starwatch Entertainment has both a completely independent music label (Starwatch Music) as well as partner-labels with different partners throughout the music industry such as SonyBMG (Columbia SevenOne Music), EMI Music (EMI 7 Music), and Universal Music (We Love Music).

== Selected artists signed ==
- Mandy Capristo
- Passenger
- Alanis Morissette
- Lenny Kravitz
- Lena
- Marit Larsen
- Stanfour
- Medina
- A-ha
- Morten Harket
- Nena
- Scorpions
- Joe Cocker
- Roger Cicero
- Kim Wilde
- Adya
- Chris de Burgh
- Udo Lindenberg
- Max Herre
- Annett Louisan
- Peter Maffay
- Aloe Blacc
- Boyzone
- Ivy Quainoo
- Tokio Hotel
- Exit Eden
