= Office siren =

TikTok trend

The office siren, also known as "corp-core" or "girlboss 2.0", is an aesthetic centered around eighties, nineties, and Y2K feminine corporate style, involving pieces like pencil skirts, blazers, heels, and "Bayonetta" glasses which "balance looking stylish while still being corporate-appropriate." It was popularized on TikTok by Generation Z starting in late 2023.

== Definition ==
The office siren aesthetic revolves around women's corporate workwear specifically meant for an office environment—usually older looks from the eighties, nineties, and two-thousands—and combines it with a sense of high fashion and a sensual, sultry edge.

Examples of those wearing the aesthetic include Bella Hadid, Michelle Obama, Kendall Jenner, Hailey Bieber, and Gisele Bündchen's character, Serena, in The Devil Wears Prada. Brands which the aesthetic looks toward for inspiration include Ralph Lauren, Miu Miu, and Calvin Klein.

== Impact ==
Shortly after the trend began, certain brands, such as Sandy Liang and Shushu/Tong, began releasing office siren–inspired pieces for their 2024 collections.

== Controversy ==
=== Appropriateness ===
Some people online questioned the appropriateness of certain office siren looks in an actual corporate environment. A few of those practicing the aesthetic reported to TikTok that they had been fired for it.

Others, in response, claimed that criticizing the professionalism of women was rooted in misogyny and that allowing women to dress confidently and ambitiously in the workplace, within reason, was liberating. Phoebe Gavin, a career and leadership coach, told USA Today that "Women are judged much more harshly for dressing in a way that is suggestive or that attracts attention in a more sexualized way; that's unfair and discriminatory, but it is the world we live in."

=== Objectification ===
Some people online, speaking from a feminist angle, questioned whether the office siren trend was objectifying women in the workplace.

Hannah Jackson, writing for Vogue, stated, "it would be naïve to believe that the office siren is exempt from falling victim to patriarchy. The trend’s over-sexed ethos may aim to empower the people (mainly young women) who wear it, but the idea of employing sexuality in a workplace is not exactly the act of authority that many young people think it is."

=== Romanticization ===
Fashion journalists questioned whether the office environment should be glamorized.

Alaina Demopoulos, writing for The Guardian, stated that "Only someone who has never truly experienced the existential dread that comes with holding down a soulless 9-to-5 would ever romanticize corporate life. And yet, this time last year, fashion influencers were doing just that."
