= Clean girl aesthetic =

Lifestyle trend

The clean girl aesthetic is a lifestyle trend, most associated with TikTok, focused on natural beauty, health, and minimalism, as well as wellness, fitness, and self-care routines.

== History ==
The clean girl aesthetic first emerged towards the end of 2021, with the term populating Google Trends in 2022. The aesthetic exists within the broader "That Girl" trend, which is described as "productive and professionally successful yet...still finds the time to eat well, meditate, read, exercise, and follow a strict skincare regime". The primary platform for the "Clean Girl" aesthetic is TikTok. As of February 2026, there have been over 1.2 million videos using the tag #CleanGirl.

Scholars have written that through the lens of Judith Butler's notion of gender performativity, femininity is defined as a repetitive performance of societal norms. To achieve the clean girl aesthetic, individuals follow a series of "performances" such as maintaining clear skin through dedicated routines, practicing thorough personal hygiene with extensive showers, eating extremely healthily, and exercising daily.

== Key characteristics ==
The clean girl aesthetic includes the use of makeup, skincare, hair styles, fashion, and lifestyle behaviors. Central to the aesthetic is the "no-makeup" makeup look, characterized by glossy lips with minimal color, blush applied heavily to give the face a rosy glow, and perfect eyebrows, while appearing effortless and undetectable. Skincare is highlighted as an extensive five-plus step routine across influencer videos, including the use of anti-aging products and anti-blemish skincare. The associated hair style is typically seen as a slicked-back bun, often with a center part in front. Alternatively, when hair is worn down, it is always smooth and shiny.

Clothing within the aesthetic is characterized by outfits with few colors, often whites, blacks, grays, and light neutrals. Within the "Clean Girl" aesthetic, the limited color palette removes distractions to bring more focus to themselves. Additionally, clothing should not be belabored while, simultaneously, looking polished and put-together. Lifestyle behaviors of a "Clean Girl" emphasize taking care of both physical and mental health, including waking up early to maximize morning hours, working out regularly (pilates as the preferred form), and eating a healthy breakfast accompanied by a green drink or matcha.

== Criticism and controversy ==
=== Cultural appropriation ===
The clean girl aesthetic has attracted numerous controversies and criticisms regarding cultural appropriation, arguing that the elements represent preexisting styles rooted in communities of color. The majority of associated influencers are white, though aspects of the trend draw from the cultures of people of color without acknowledgement. Examples include the use of brown lip liner, slicked-back/oiled hair styles, and gua sha. Historically, Black and Brown women who wore their hair slicked back or showed off jewelry were labeled as 'trashy', 'dirty', and 'ghetto' whereas white women following similar practices have not faced the same stigma.

=== Perfectionism ===
The aesthetic has also been criticized for promoting unrealistic beauty standards and reinforcing the notion that women must be "constantly improving, optimizing, and managing themselves." Furthermore, the "Clean Girl" aesthetic "frames identity as something to be visually managed and optimized", which values are tied closely to appearance, while being "under the disguise of wellness or self-care." Additional criticism has focused on the negative impact that the aesthetic is having on the body positivity movement. As part of the "Clean Girl" lifestyle, attending pilates is crucial, and ideally bodies need to look slim and toned, not too muscular, and not too curvy.

== See also ==
- That Girl (trend)
- Beauty standard
- Soft girl
- Coquette aesthetic
- VSCO girl
