= Softie =

Softie may refer to:

- Softie (2020 film), Kenyan documentary
- Softie (2021 film), French coming-of-age film
- Soft girl, describing a youth subculture
