= That Girl (disambiguation) =

That Girl is a 1960s American television sitcom.

That Girl may also refer to:

== Music ==
- That Girl (album), by Jennifer Nettles, 2014
- "That Girl" (Esthero song), 1999
- "That Girl" (Frankie J song), 2006
- "That Girl" (Jennifer Nettles song), 2013
- "That Girl" (Jung Yong-hwa song), 2017
- "That Girl" (Marques Houston song), 2003
- "That Girl" (Maxi Priest song), 1996
- "That Girl" (McFly song), 2004
- "That Girl" (Miranda Murphy song), 2004
- "That Girl" (Mischa Daniels song), 2012
- "That Girl" (Noisettes song), 2012
- "That Girl" (Stevie Wonder song), 1981
- "That Girl" (Tyla song), 2026
- "That Girl", by All Time Low from Dirty Work
- "That Girl", by Andy Kim, 1968
- "That Girl", by Bad Company from Fame and Fortune, 1986
- "That Girl", by Bone Thugs from New Waves, 2017
- "That Girl", by Christopher Cross from Every Turn of the World, 1985
- "That Girl", by David Choi, 2010
- "That Girl", by FM from Indiscreet, 1986
- "That Girl", by Justin Timberlake from The 20/20 Experience, 2013
- "That Girl", by NLT, 2007
- "That Girl", by Olly Murs from 24 Hrs, 2016
- "That Girl", by Pharrell from In My Mind, 2006
- "That Girl", by Plain White T's from Big Bad World, 2008
- "That Girl", by Raven-Symoné from Raven-Symoné, 2008
- "That Girl", by Tegan and Sara from Love You to Death, 2016

== Other uses ==
- That Girl (trend), an internet aesthetic and wellness trend

== See also ==
- Who's That Girl? (disambiguation)
- This Girl (disambiguation)
