= Bunny Roger =

English couturier and socialite (1911–1997)

- Roger posing for Hardy Amies
- Born: Neil Munro Roger; 9 June 1911; London, England
- Died: 27 April 1997 (aged 85); London, England
- Known for: Couturier; Socialite

Neil Munro "Bunny" Roger (9 June 1911 – 27 April 1997) was an English couturier and socialite. Roger's best-known contribution to fashion was his invention or popularization of Capri pants.

== Early life and education ==
Neil Munro Roger was born 9 June 1911 in London to Sir Alexander Roger and Helen Stuart Clark, both from Scotland. He was nicknamed Bunny because a nurse described him looking "like a dear little bunny rabbit" when he was a baby. His father was the chairman of Telephone and General Trust Limited, and his mother was the daughter of a mayor of Leith. Roger had an older brother named Alan and a younger brother named Sandy; all three brothers were bachelors until their deaths. Roger was raised in Ewhurst Park, Hampsire, where his family were tenants of the Duke of Wellington. The family had 14 servants there.

He attended the Loretto School, which he reportedly did not enjoy. When his father offered him a reward if he won a place on the Loretto Nippers football team, the reward Roger chose was a dollhouse.

At the University of Oxford, Roger read history at Balliol College. He was tutored by F.F. Urquhart, and he joined the Oxford University Dramatic Society, where he befriended Terence Rattigan. After a year, Roger left Balliol College to join the Ruskin School of Art, though he was soon expelled because "his obvious homosexuality was a corrupting influence on other students".

== Career ==
Following his expulsion from the University of Oxford, Roger found work as an assistant in Waring & Gillow, where he helped to decorate the palace of Zog I. After working in the tailoring department of Fortnum & Mason, he was encouraged by Edward Molyneux and Victor Stiebel to make his own dressmaking shop. He used a £1000 gift from his father to do so.

Roger's dressmaking shop was named Neil Roger. It was opened on Great Newport Street, London, in 1937, and it was designed in the Regency Gothic style. Within three months of its opening, he was described as "one of the best-known designers in London." Early clients included Vivien Leigh, Princess Marina of Greece and Denmark, and the Lygon sisters. His work in this period has been described as both "sexy and tasteful" and inspired by Marlene Dietrich.

In the Second World War, he was commissioned in the Rifle Brigade in 1941 and served in Italy and North Africa. Roger was known for his courage under fire. A story that may be apocryphal has him replying to a sergeant's question regarding approaching Germans, "When in doubt, powder heavily."

Following the war, he was invited to run the couture department at Fortnum & Mason. He invested in the House of Amies, and his stake was later acquired by Debenhams in 1973.

Capri pants, introduced by fashion designer Sonja de Lennart in 1948, were popularized by her and Roger.

Roger was a clotheshorse who bought up to fifteen bespoke suits a year and four pairs of bespoke shoes or boots to go with each suit; each suit was said to have cost around £2,000. He favoured a neo-Edwardian look: four-buttoned jackets with broad shoulders, narrow waists, and long skirts. He favoured narrow trousers and a high-crowned bowler hat. He was particularly fond of spectator shoes and ruby cufflinks.

Roger was known for the lavish and outrageous parties that he held throughout his life. These events were often themed, as in the Diamond, Amethyst, and Flame Balls held to celebrate his 60th, 70th, and 80th birthdays, respectively.

== Death ==
Roger died in London on 27 April 1997. He was 85 years old.
