= Pedal pushers =

Calf-length women's trousers

Pedal pushers are a type of cropped pants. The name "pedal pushers" originated from the style's appeal to cyclists, as the shorter length makes bike riding easier. The style quickly became identified with teenage girls. Often cuffed and worn tight to the skin, they are related in style to capri pants, and are sometimes referred to as "clam diggers."

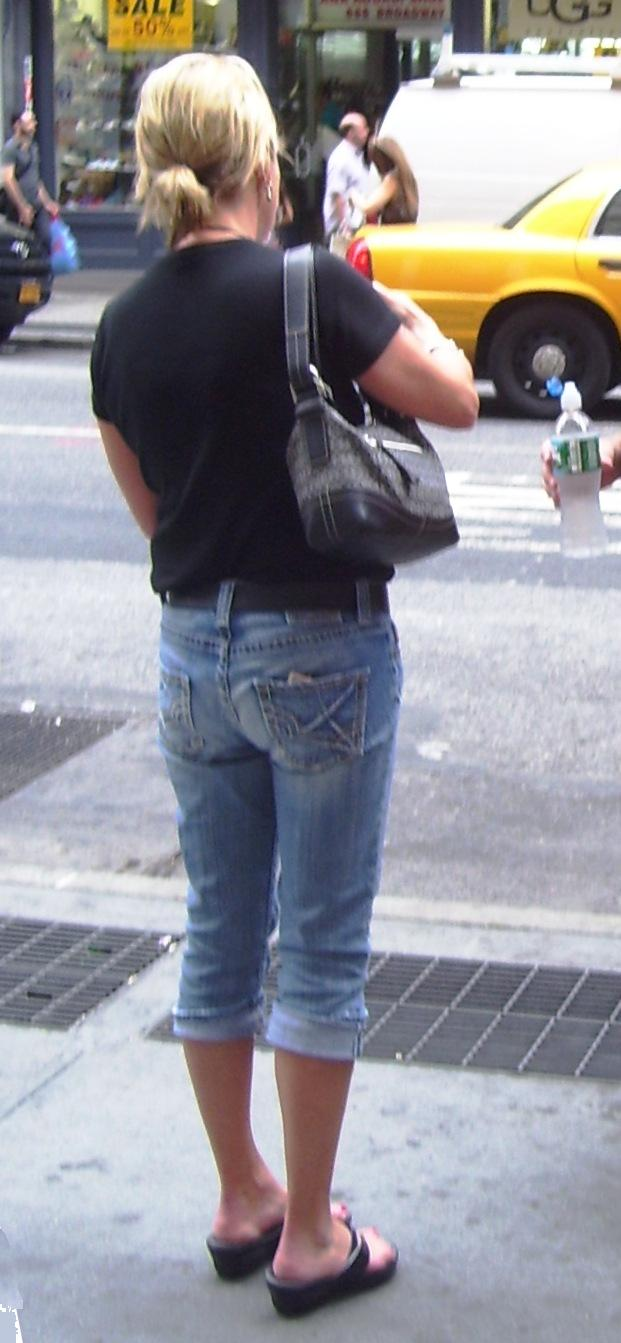
A woman wearing denim pedal pushers on Broadway in SoHo, New York City (Summer 2011).

== History ==
First seen as knickerbockers or "knickers," pedal pushers were baggy trousers that extended to or just below the knee and were most commonly fastened with either a button or a buckle. Knickerbockers were initially worn by men in the late 19th century and over time became part of women's fashion.

In the1950s and the early 1960s cropped trousers were a popular style for women. The 1990s/2000s remained a stylish silhouette for casual wear. Sex and the City, a popular late 90s/early 00s TV show, featured fictional fashionista main character Carrie Bradshaw wearing pedal pushers in various episodes of the show. Carrie Bradshaw is considered an icon in both television and fashion to this day.

The 2023 runways showcased several pedal pusher styles, now commonly referred to as "Capris" or “capri pants”. Designers took the classic pedal pusher and created modern and new ways to style the latest iterations. The New York fashion shows of Tory Burch, Sandy Liang, and 3.1 Phillip Lim, along with the London runways of labels Chopova Lowena, Supriya Lele, and Susan Fang all featured pedal pushers. As of January 2024, pedal pushers re-emerged in popularity in cities such as New York and Copenhagen.

== Characteristics ==
Pedal pushers are typically straight, close fitting pants that end at the knee. The look can be coordinated with a tiny top like crop top. Pedal pushers can also be worn with a tank top and belt for a slim flattering look. While pedal pushers were originally considered casual wear, by the 2020s women wore them as work attire.

== Gallery ==
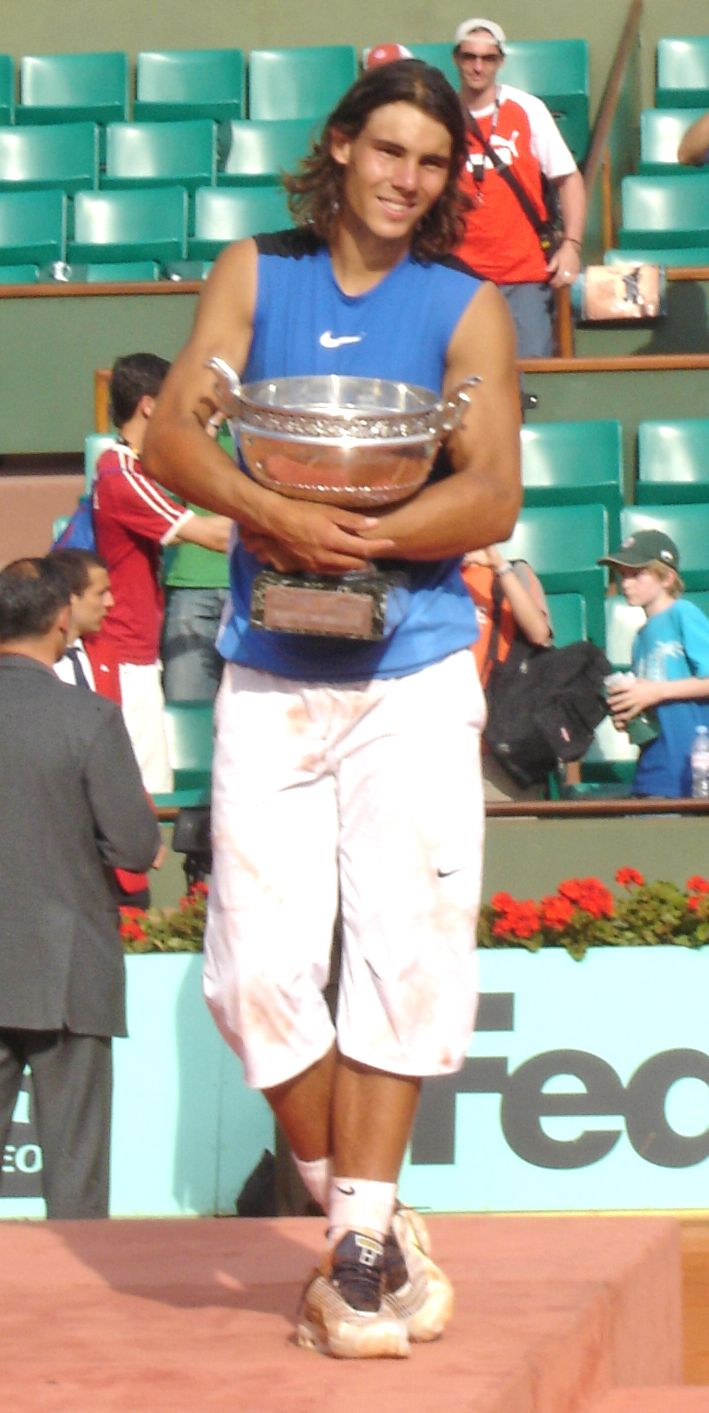
Spanish tennis player Rafael Nadal in loose-fit pedal pushers

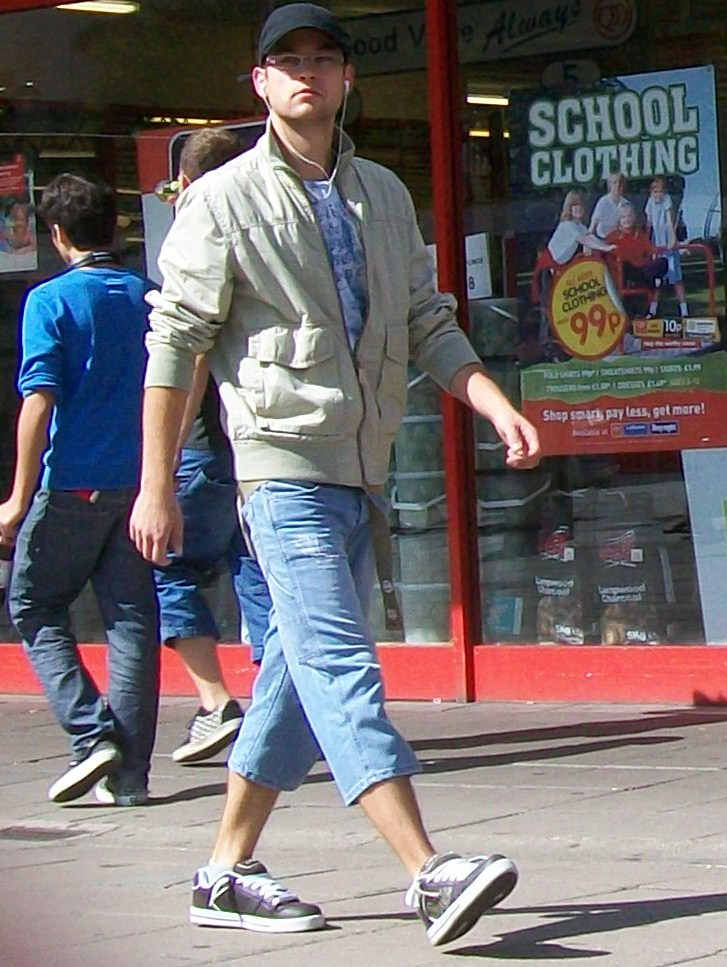
Male in cropped jeans (man-pris)

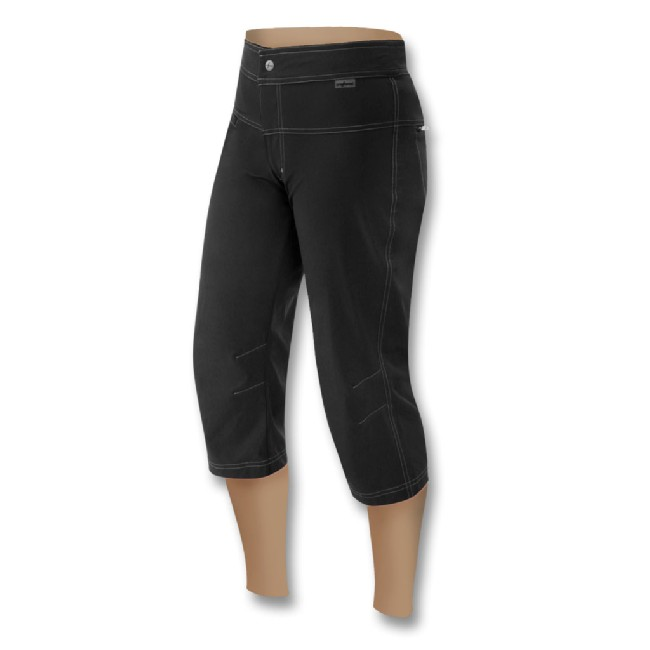
Loose-fit, black, bike Capris

== See also ==
- Carrie Bradshaw
- Jeans
- Sandy Liang
- Copenhagen Fashion Week
- Vogue
- Sex and the City
