= Shushu/Tong =

Shanghai-based fashion label

- Industry: Fashion design
- Founded: 2015
- Founder: Liushu Lei; Yutong Jiang
- Headquarters: Shanghai, China
- Website: shushutongstudio.com

Shushu/Tong, also stylized as SHUSHU/TONG, is a Shanghai-based fashion label founded in 2015 by designers Liushu Lei and Yutong Jiang. Its design sensibility is inspired by girlhood, nostalgia, and retro anime and films. The brand name comes from the homonym of "Tong" and "tree" in the two founders' names, and the theme of the brand is to create ready-to-wear clothing for "modern independent women with a girly heart.”

== History ==
Founders Liushu Lei and Yutong Jiang were both born in Chengdu and attended the same high school. Both Lei and Jiang were inspired by the anime Nana to become designers, although Jiang was briefly interested in becoming a cartoonist before realizing she preferred fashion. The two met at Shanghai's Donghua University when studying fashion in 2014. The two went on to acquire MA degrees at London College of Fashion, where the two were flatmates and first conceived of the brand. Lei spent time interning with Simone Rocha, and Jiang with Gareth Pugh. After a failing to acquire a visa to stay in London, Shushu/Tong was officially founded in 2015 in Shanghai. The label's name is a combination of Lei's nickname, Shushu, and Jiang's given name, Yutong. The first physical Shushu/Tong store opened in July 2022 in Shanghai JC Plaza.

Lei is the creative director of the brand, while Jiang is more involved on the marketing and client side, although she also has input on the design process. Their first sales were made on Chinese social media platform WeChat, before the brand was picked up by other stockists; social media has been an avenue which allowed their brand to grow despite not being located in a traditional fashion capital like Paris. The brand has collaborated with Asics and Charles & Keith, for footwear, local brand Yvmin for a line of jewelry, and Estée Lauder for holiday cosmetic gift sets. The brand's collaboration with Estée Lauder was noted as the first time a global brand had collaborated with a Chinese fashion brand.

== Design and influences ==
Shushu/Tong is noted for its hyper-feminine style, having been compared to the coquette aesthetic trend, balletcore, soft girl subculture and Lolita fashion. The brand was noted for predating the trend of hyper-girly clothing after 2020. Their designs often incorporate girly elements like frills, bows, ribbons, and pearls, as well as gingham and pastel fabric. Works that have inspired collections include the Aim for the Ace!, The Virgin Suicides, Gigi, and the protagonists of magical girl anime such as Puella Magi Madoka Magica and Cardcaptor Sakura. The founders named Chloë Sevigny and Tina Chow as muses, and Faye Wong as a perennial inspiration as well as celebrity they would like to dress someday.

Shushu/Tong is one of some rising Chinese fashion brands associated with guochao (Chinese: 国潮; pinyin: Guó cháo), a fashion trend among younger Chinese shoppers to prefer homegrown designers which incorporate aspects of Chinese history and culture. Vogue Business noted in 2024 that the brand was a rare example of a Chinese designer able to succeed both domestically and abroad.

Jiang also serves as a muse for Lei, as she models items and provides early feedback, giving a woman's perspective to Lei's designs. The two designers have acknowledged that this may have contributed to criticism against the brand for its limited range of body shapes.
