= This Girl =

This Girl may refer to:

- "This Girl" (Cookin' on 3 Burners song), 2016
- "This Girl" (Stafford Brothers and Eva Simons song), 2014
- "This Girl", a 1995 song by Chumbawamba from Swingin' with Raymond
- "This Girl", a song by Dala from This Moment Is a Flash, 2005
- "This Girl", a song by Kylie Minogue from Impossible Princess, 1997
- "This Girl", a song by Lauren Daigle from Look Up Child, 2018
- "This Girl (Has Turned Into a Woman)", a song by Mary MacGregor from Torn Between Two Lovers, 1976

== See also ==
- That Girl (disambiguation)
