= Wonyoungism =

Social media trend

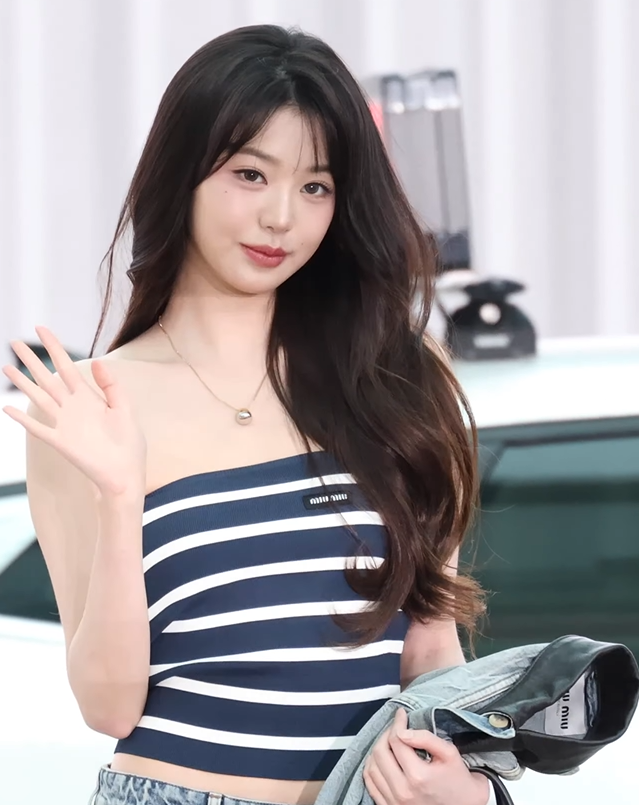
Wonyoung in 2025

Wonyoungism, also referred to as #Wonyoungism or the Wonyoung effect, is a trend on social media among some K-pop fans based around former Iz*One member and current Ive member Jang Won-young, also known mononymously as Wonyoung. Despite its name, Wonyoungism has not been addressed or acknowledged by Jang herself and is entirely propagated by her fans.

Some supporters of Wonyoungism describe it as a source of self-motivation, self-care, and an expression of the coquette aesthetic. Critics argue that it encourages eating disorders by fostering low self-esteem, unhealthy body image, perfectionism, and other harmful lifestyle habits. They also contend that it unfairly damages Jang's reputation by linking such behaviors to her.

== Background and history ==
Jang Won-young (born August 31, 2004) is a South Korean singer who made her debut in the girl group Iz*One after finishing in first place in the reality competition show Produce 48 in 2018. After Iz*One disbanded in 2021, she debuted again in the girl group Ive, under Starship Entertainment. Wonyoung has appeared in numerous advertisements, modeled for several products and fashion lines, and otherwise become "a blue chip in the advertising world", according to Maeil Business Newspaper in 2022. In 2024, Steffi Cao wrote in The Daily Beast that Wonyoung was "something of a platonic ideal for fans online... confident, smart, pretty, sophisticated, according to those following her; so much so that she has evolved past typical celebrity into a quasi-religious figure."

Some have identified the start of Wonyoungism in 2023, when a sound bite of Wonyoung saying "I don't care—you are you, I am me" went viral, after which the #Wonyoungism hashtag exploded in popularity. By April 2024, #Wonyoungism had nearly 300,000 posts on TikTok, with countless comments attesting to its life-changing qualities.

== Themes ==
Wonyoungism generally "combines the soft, girlish elements of the 'coquette' aesthetic with self-improvement rhetoric", with both parts largely modeled on Wonyoung herself. Grazia Singapore wrote, "the trend stems from the pursuit of the goddess-like perfection that the idol embodies. In a nutshell, the Wonyoung effect is all about self-care, from skincare, to makeup and fitness—think: what would Wonyoung do?"

Some proponents have tried to use Wonyoung's specific makeup products in pursuit of her look, namely "Doe eyes, rosy cheeks and... the glossy lips", with some even going to Wonyoung's beauty salon, Oui Oui Atelier in Seoul, to achieve it. Proponents have also bought books Wonyoung has read, such as Super-Translation: The Words of Buddha and Schopenhauer to Read in Your Forties, both of which saw rapid surges in sales after being recommended by or seen with Wonyoung.

== Criticism ==
In Dazed, Ella Jones wrote that disordered eating content, already prevalent in the K-pop community, had escalated "to an even more worrying extent" among some proponents of Wonyoungism, though "Wonyoung herself has been careful to warn against extreme diet or lifestyle choices." Jones wrote, "Speculation on Wonyoung's diet, 'inspiration' that might suit a rabbit, and dangerously low weigh-ins", as well as "elements of body image perfectionism" were widespread in the #Wonyoungism hashtag, especially among girls aged between 11 and 16.

Cao also wrote that there was a hyperfixation within Wonyoungism on exercise, thin bodies, and weight loss, though like Jones, she said that Wonyoung does not promote or even seem to practice certain lifestyle habits within Wonyoungism; she cited a 2021 livestream in which Wonyoung said dieting is "bad for you". Citing therapist Jennifer Whang, Cao noted that some aspects of Wonyoungism show troubling signs of early eating disorders among children at a time when such harms are unrecognizable to them, likening it to 2010s trends such as Tumblr's eating disorder culture or celebrity diet fads like the "IU Diet."

Some Ive fans have criticized Wonyoungism, or "the 'toxic Wonyoungism' community", for unhealthy body image messaging and denigrating the reputation of both Wonyoung and Ive as a whole. An anonymous user told Dazed: "it might be a hot take, but 'Wonyoungism' ruined Ive for me. A lot of the TikTok girls just focus on weight loss and EDs—I feel so bad for Wonyoung, she doesn't deserve this."

Some proponents of Wonyoungism say that toxic lifestyle habits such as disordered eating and obsession with fitness are not in fact endorsed by the trend, with some calling such content "shameless" and "promoting things that can cause harm to someone's life." Some Wonyoungism content creators have tried to steer the trend toward body positivity and finding other avenues of encouragement. A TikTok content creator named Anastasia told The Daily Beast, "I am sure that Wonyoung herself would not want her name to be associated with unhealthy practices. We should take care of our body and mind. That is the main message of the movement."
