= Capri pants =

Calf-length trousers

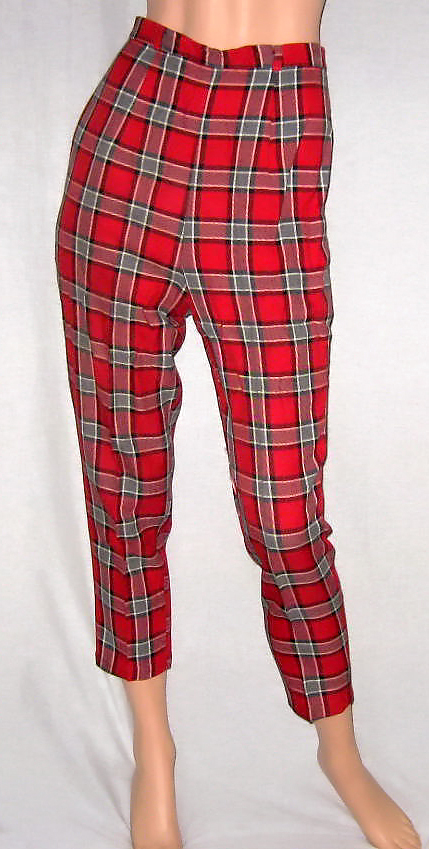
- Designer: Sonja de Lennart, Bunny Roger
- Type: trousers

Capri pants (also known as pedal pushers, three quarter legs, or capris, crop pants, man-pris, clam-diggers, flood pants, ankle pants, jams, highwaters, or toreador pants) are pants that are longer than shorts, but are not as long as trousers. Capri pants can be a generic term for any cropped slim pants, and used as a specific term to refer to pants that end on the ankle bone.

== History ==
Capri pants were introduced by fashion designer Sonja de Lennart in 1948, and were popularized by her and English couturier Bunny Roger. The name of the pants is derived from the Italian isle of Capri, where they rose to popularity in the late 1950s and early 1960s. The actress Audrey Hepburn was among the first movie stars who wore capris, and the pants quickly became synonymous with her classic style. The French actress Brigitte Bardot famously wore capri pants at a time when trousers were still a new fashion for women. Marilyn Monroe always traveled with capri pants.

Capri pants were popularized in the United States in the 1960s television series The Dick Van Dyke Show. The character Laura Petrie, the young housewife played by Mary Tyler Moore, caused a fashion sensation—and some mild controversy—by wearing close-fitting capri pants throughout the show's run (capris that were later referred to as 1950s hausfrau).

By the mid-1960s, capri-style tight-fitting cargo pants became popular among teenage boys; a good example was the superstar teen actor of that era, Luke Halpin, who wore them in some episodes of the popular Flipper. After a drop in popularity during the 1970s through the 1990s, capri pants returned to favor in the mid-2000s. Spanish tennis player Rafael Nadal wore capri pants in the majority of his matches before 2009 following a deal with Nike to wear sponsored capris, a deal that Roger Federer had turned down before him.

== Gallery ==
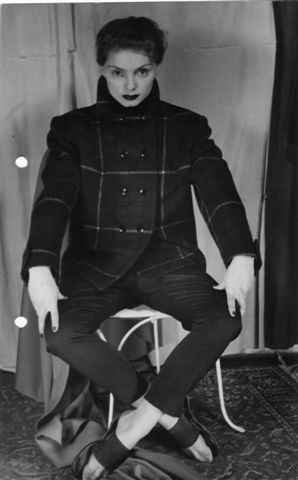
Model Erni Mangold wearing Sonja de Lennart Capris, 1949

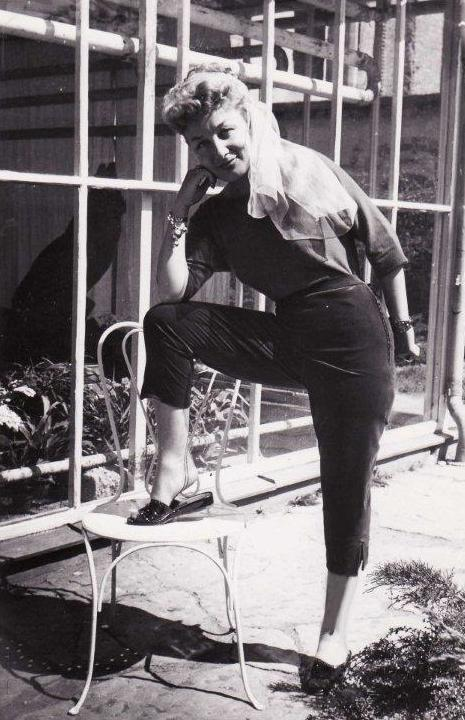
Model Mady Rahl wearing Sonja de Lennart Capris, 1949

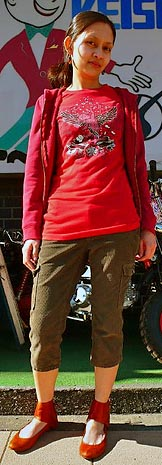
Woman in capris (2007)

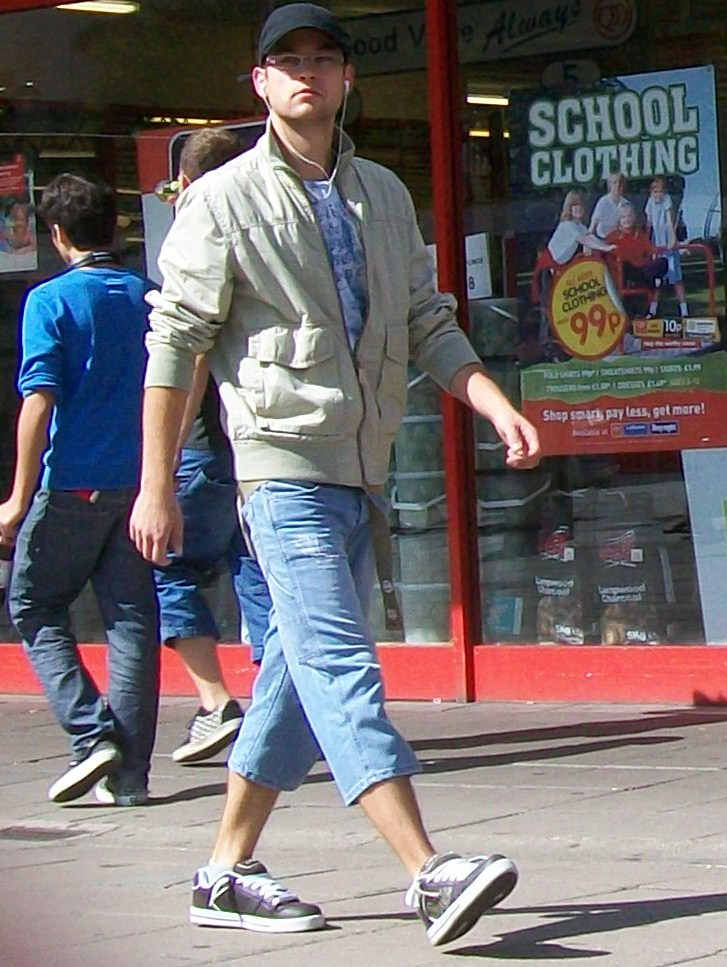
Man in cropped jeans (man-pris) (Stevenage, 2009)

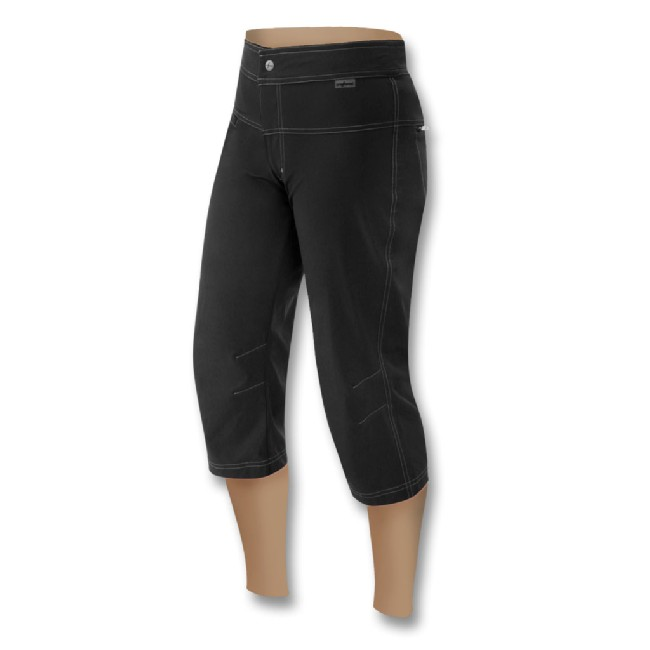
Loose-fit, black, bike capris

== See also ==
- Clothing
- Culottes
- Fashion
- Knickerbockers
- Pedal pushers
