= Who's That Girl? =

Who's That Girl? may refer to:

== Film and television ==
- Who's That Girl (1987 film), an American film starring Madonna
- Who's That Girl, a Philippine film of 2011
- "Who's That Girl?", an episode of Wow! Wow! Wubbzy!

== Music ==
- Who's That Girl World Tour, a tour by Madonna
- Ciao Italia: Live from Italy, a DVD of the tour by Madonna

=== Albums ===
- Who's That Girl (soundtrack), from the 1987 film
- Who's That Girl?, by Anahí de Cárdenas, 2013

=== Songs ===
- "Who's That Girl?" (Eurythmics song), 1983
- "Who's That Girl?" (Eve song), 2001
- "Who's That Girl" (Guy Sebastian song), 2010
- "Who's That Girl" (Madonna song), 1987
- "Who's That Girl" (Robyn song), 2005
- "Who's That Girl" (Stephanie Bentley song), 1996
- "Who's That Girl (She's Got It)", by A Flock of Seagulls, 1985
- "Who Dat Girl", by Flo Rida and Akon, 2010
- "Who's Dat Girl", by Ayra Starr and Rema, 2025
- "Who's That Girl?", by Hilary Duff from Hilary Duff, 2004
- "Who's That Girl", by Lasgo from Far Away, 2005

== Other uses ==
- Who's That Girl?, a 2009 novel by Alexandra Potter
- Who's That Girl?, a 2015 novel by Mhairi McFarlane
- Who's That Girl?, a toy from MGA Entertainment

== See also ==
- That Girl (disambiguation)
