= Regencycore =

2020s aesthetic trend

Regencycore, or sometimes royalcore, is a fashion style and internet aesthetic inspired by clothing worn in early 19th-century Europe. The rise of regencycore is widely attributed to the popularity of the Netflix television series Bridgerton, which takes place in a fictionalized version of Regency-era Britain and premiered at the end of 2020.

== History ==
The enduring popularity of the English author Jane Austen led to a long tradition of fiction inspired by works like Pride and Prejudice or Emma, including movie and television adaptations as well as the romance novel sub-genre of Regency romance, established by the historical novelist Georgette Heyer. Among these include the series Bridgerton, which was adapted for television by Netflix in 2020. The series' lead costume designer is Ellen Mirojnick, who chose to create an anachronistic and exaggerated version of Regency fashion that would feel "scandalous and modern." Mirojnick found inspiration in the 1950s and 1960s, particularly Dior's New Look. Although the empire waist silhouette was maintained, elements that were common during the Regency era such as bonnets and muslin fabric were eliminated, and detail and color were added with embellishments such as glitter and fabrics like organza or tulle.

After the debut of Bridgerton in December 2020, the term "regencycore" first began to appear in the beginning of 2021. Some writers connected the trend to the distress and isolation caused by the COVID-19 lockdowns, which caused audiences to crave nostalgic, escapist fantasy.

Regencycore elements appeared in the 2022 Met Gala, which was themed "Gilded Glamour" after the Gilded Age.

After the debut of the second season of Bridgerton in March 2022, internet searches for terms like "regency dress," "silk gloves," and "cropped jackets" increased significantly.

== Aesthetic elements ==
The regencycore aesthetic is associated with a number of specific fashion elements including low, square necklines, pearl and feather accessories, empire and babydoll silhouettes, puffed or cap sleeves, opera gloves, and elaborate headgear.

However, regencycore also encompasses a general feeling of opulence and hyper-femininity, as well as styles more associated with the Victorian era or Marie Antoinette, such as full-length corsets (short stays were more common during the Regency period) and powdered wigs. Regencycore may be extended beyond clothing into interior design, makeup, and hairdressing as well as activities like afternoon tea, ballroom dancing, or reading Regency-era novels. The trend is also associated with Selkie, a clothing brand known for its viral chiffon puff-sleeved dresses.

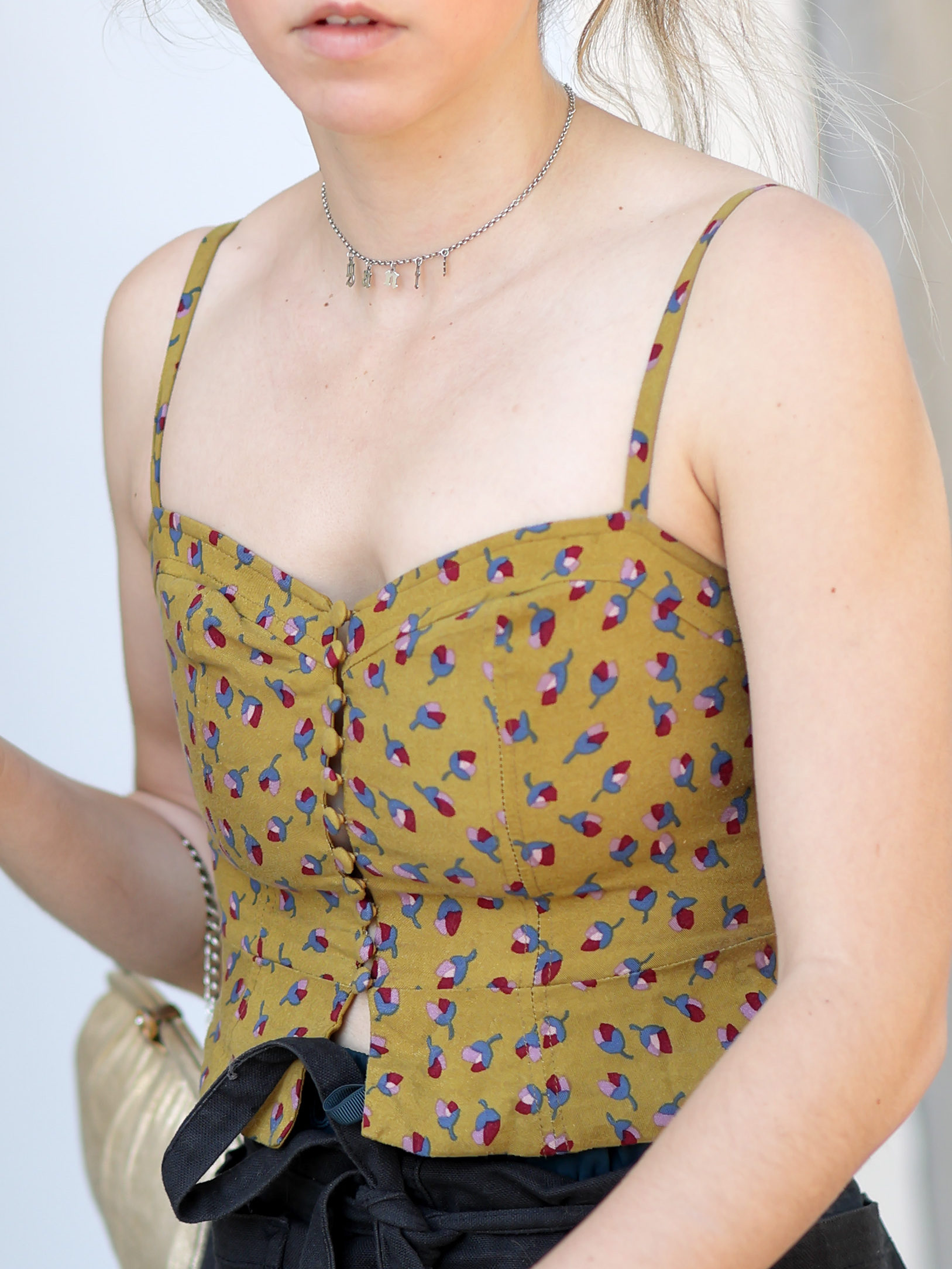
Corset-style tank top, 2021

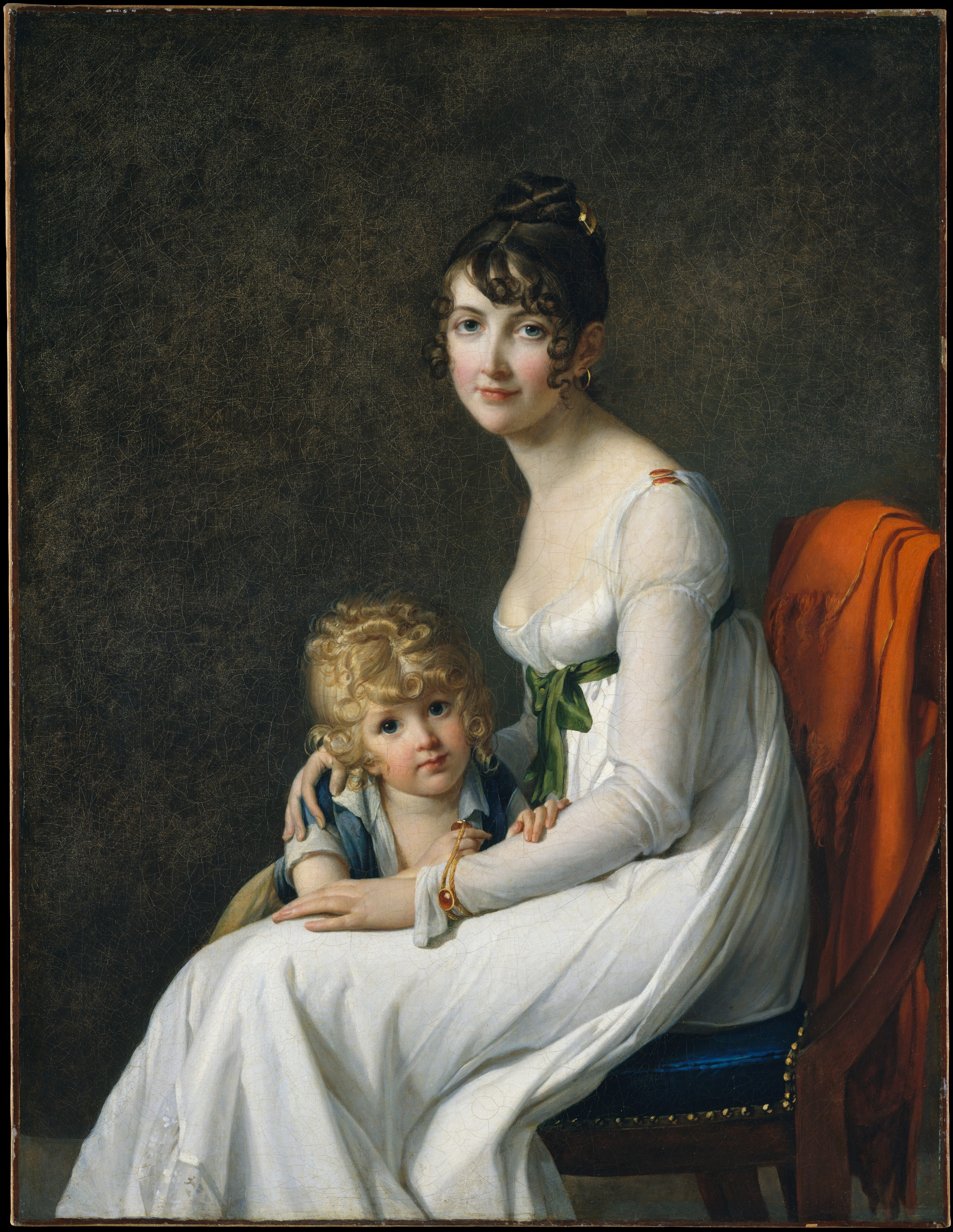
Portrait of Madame Philippe Panon Desbassayns de Richemont, in typical Regency dress. The painting is featured in Bridgerton.

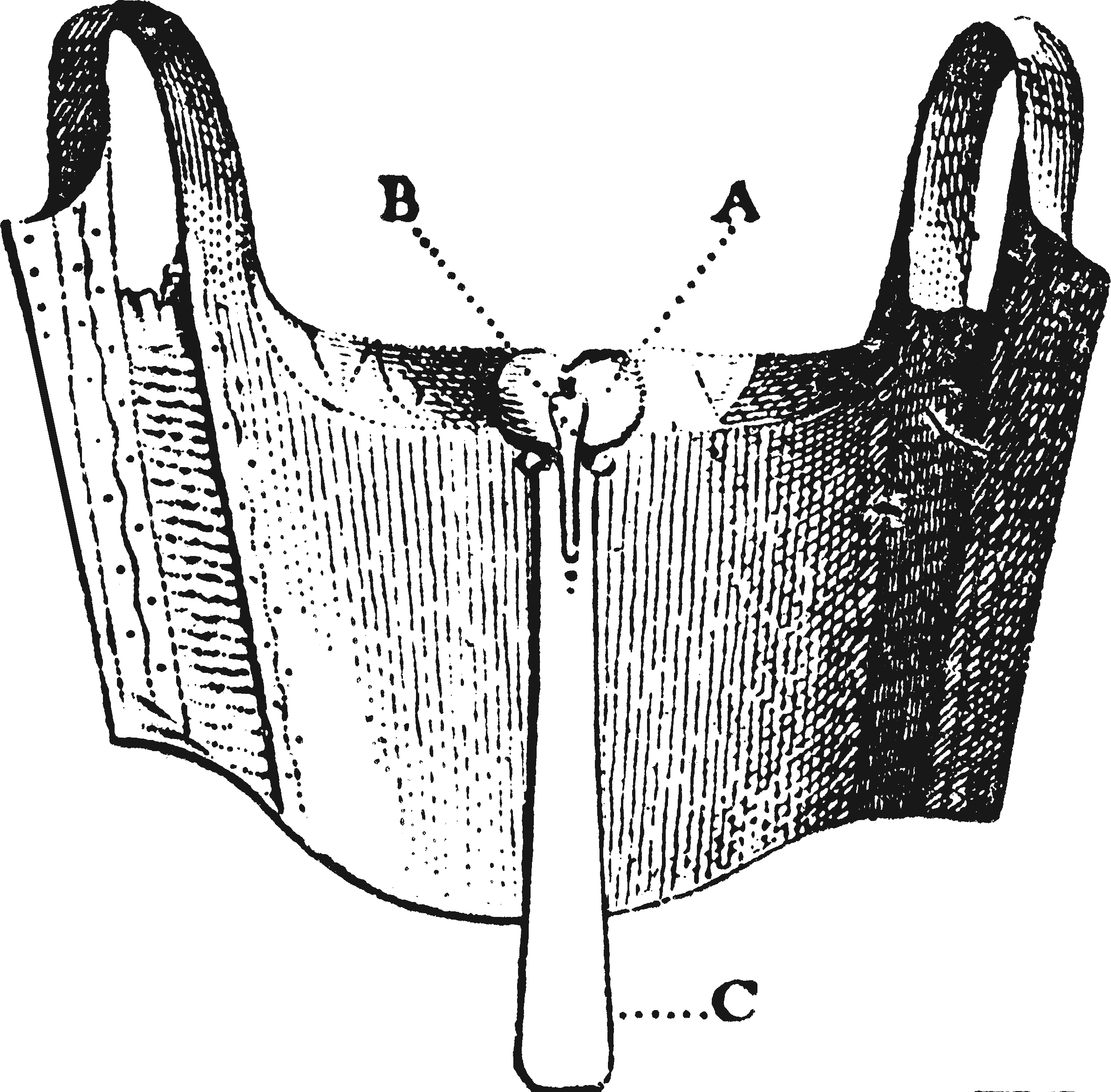
1808 short stays, a typical Regency era undergarment

== See also ==
- Coquette aesthetic
- Cottagecore
- Dolly Kei
- Janeite
- Light academia
- Living history
- Lolita fashion, Japanese street style inspired by Rococo and Victorian clothing
- Neo-Victorian, an aesthetic movement that features an overt nostalgia for the Victorian period
- Rococo, 18th-century aesthetic movement characterized by opulence and drama
