= Coquette aesthetic =

Fashion trend

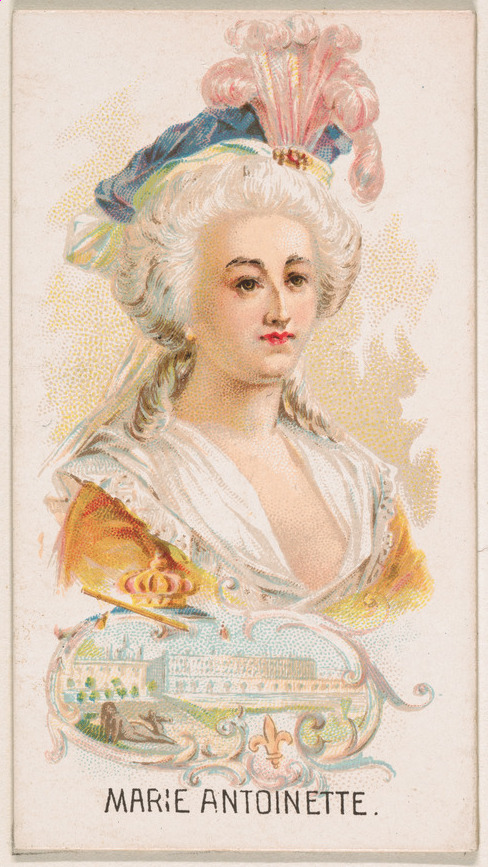
Queen Marie Antoinette, the inspiration of this aesthetic

Coquette aesthetic is a 2020s Gen Z fashion trend that is characterized by a mix of sweet, romantic, and sometimes playful elements that focus on femininity through the use of clothes with lace, flounces, pastel colors, and bows. It often draws inspiration from historical periods, such as the Victorian era and the 1950s–'60s, with a modern twist.

== Significance and history ==
The word "coquette", which is a French word, means flirtatious. The aesthetic gained popularity on Tumblr in the early 2010s and TikTok around 2021, but has roots in earlier feminine fashion trends including Japanese Lolita fashion, and is often compared to other aesthetics such as Balletcore, Cottagecore, and Princesscore.

This aesthetic has been characterized as both a way to relive and express creativity through childhood fantasies, and a way to "fully escape into femininity without feeling guilty about it," while ultimately being "self-aware and playful". It allows strong women to also see themselves as feminine and delicate, moving away from the previous stereotype that female empowerment leads to masculinization. Simultaneously, the coquette aesthetic seeks to defend femininity without sexualization, and to celebrate things that were once a source of ridicule or were demonized. Just as it happened in later times during the French Revolution, when society condemned maximalism and the exaltation of the feminine clothing of Marie Antoinette to move on to silhouettes closer to men's fashion, the same occurred with the coquette aesthetic that moved away from the power suit of the 1980s and the newest aesthetics of oversize, tomboy core and military core. Proponents of the aesthetic argue that it can be understood from a disruptive non-heteronormative interpretation.

== Criticism ==
The coquette aesthetic has been critiqued for reproducing damaging gender roles for women and for its potential appeal for the male gaze. At the same time, the aesthetic primarily derives from "French culture and outdated notions of European femininity," and online images related to this aesthetic almost always portray thin, light-skinned women, which can exclude women who have less hegemonic characteristics. Other criticisms of the coquette aesthetic have also drawn upon similar stances that critics of the Lolicon media genre have made, which have stated that the coquette aesthetic as a product of its inspirations and style could be suggestive and problematic in regard to pedophiles. Defenders of the aesthetic affirm that the use of bun, laces and pink-colored clothing should not assume a victimization for women and these aesthetics are not responsible for misogynistic aggressions.

== Inspirations ==
Admirers of the coquette aesthetic draw inspiration from a vast tapestry of historical eras, including the Rococo, Regency, Victorian, and Edwardian periods. In cinema and television, foundational influences range from Sofia Coppola’s The Virgin Suicides, Marie Antoinette, and Priscilla to contemporary hits like Netflix’s Bridgerton, Greta Gerwig’s Barbie, and Melanie Martinez’s 2019 film K-12.

Filmmaker Yorgos Lanthimos and pop icons Lana Del Rey, Ariana Grande, and Jennie (Blackpink) are also revered as central figures of the subculture. Literary and media touchstones include the classic novels of Jane Austen and the Brontë sisters, Vladimir Nabokov’s Lolita, and modern works such as Ottessa Moshfegh’s My Year of Rest and Relaxation and Sylvia Plath’s The Bell Jar.

Moreover, enthusiasts of the subculture appreciate cult media like the American podcast Red Scare, the Brazilian zine RÉPLICA, and micro-communities on X (formerly Twitter) such as dollettetwt.

== See also ==
- Balletcore
- Dolly Kei
- Lolita fashion
- Regencycore
- Soft girl
- Wonyoungism
