= Sonja de Lennart =

German fashion designer (born 1920)

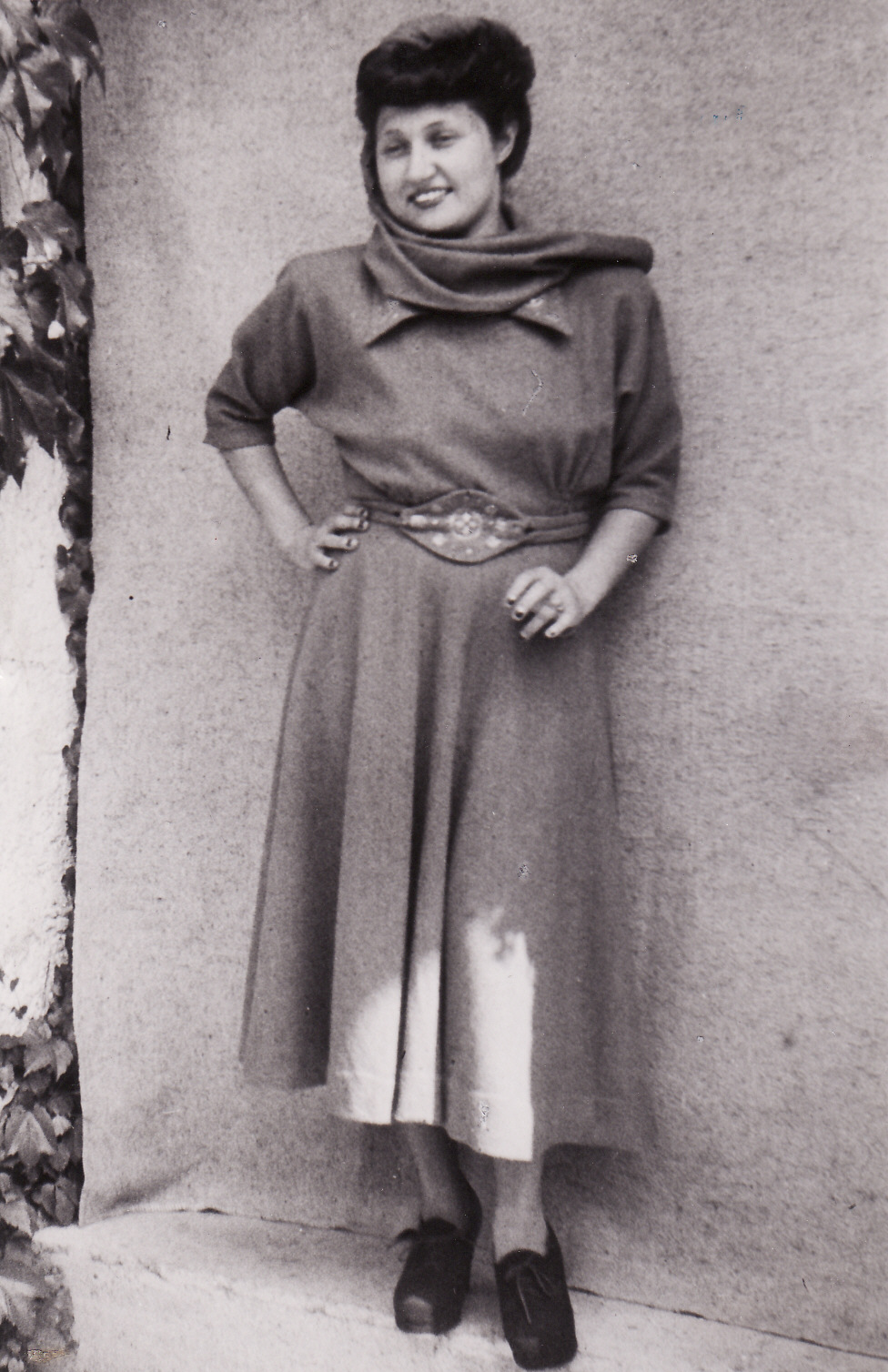
- Born: 21 May 1920 (age 106); Prussia
- Occupation: Fashion designer
- Years active: 1945–present
- Known for: Inventing capri pants

Sonja de Lennart (born 21 May 1920) is a German fashion designer. In 1945, she invented capri pants.

== Early life ==
De Lennart was born in Prussia in 1920. She grew up in Wrocław, and then studied textiles in Berlin.

== Fashion career ==
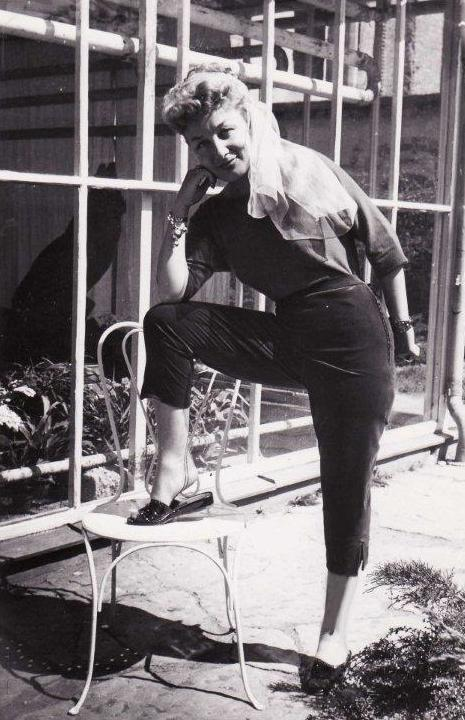
Mady Rahl modeling capri pants

In 1945, after the war, Sonja de Lennart began to produce fashion wear and opened her first boutique, Salon Sonja, in Munich. In the beginning, she would cut a piece of paper to demonstrate the fit of clothing on her customers.

Her design collection was named the Capri Collection after the Island of Capri that was important to the designer.

De Lennart first made Capri pants in the late 1940s and the actresses Mady Rahl and Erni Mangold wore them in 1949. The Capri pant had a short slit on the outer-side of the pant leg, and they started to become popular in 1954 when Audrey Hepburn wore them in the movie A Heart and a Crown.

In 1952, Edith Head used de Lennart's Capri Collection including a skirt, a high-neck blouse, and Capri pants for Audrey Hepburn in the movie, Roman Holiday.
