= Soft girl =

Subculture

Soft girl or softie describes a youth subculture that emerged among Gen Z women in 2019. Soft girl is a fashion style and a lifestyle, popular on social media, based on a deliberately cutesy, feminine look with a "girly girl" attitude. Being a soft girl also may involve a tender, sweet, and sensitive personality.

The soft girl aesthetic gained popularity primarily on TikTok. Singer-songwriter Ariana Grande has been credited with popularizing it.

== Aesthetics ==
The trend consists mainly of soft pastel colors, Y2K, anime, K-pop, and 1990s-inspired clothing, as well as cute and nostalgic prints with flowers and hearts, stuffed animals, fluffy pillows, and other soft and cuddly items. It parallels some Kawaii aesthetics, but with a more subdued look.

== See also ==
- Balletcore
- Barbiecore
- Coquette aesthetic
- E-girls and e-boys
- Fairy Kei
- Girly girl
- Girly Kei
- Gyaru
- Kawaii fashion
- Scene (subculture)
- Shushu/Tong
- VSCO girl
