= Sandy Liang =

Fashion label based in New York City

- Industry: Fashion design
- Founded: 2014; 12 years ago
- Founder: Sandy Liang
- Headquarters: New York City, United States
- Born: June 4, 1991; New York City, New York
- Education: Rhode Island School of Design, Parsons School of Design
- Spouse: Dorian Booth
- Website: Official website

Sandy Liang is a fashion label based in New York City. Founded in 2014 by Sandy Liang, its designs are inspired by nostalgia, girlhood, and grandmothers in Chinatown.

== Founder ==
Sandy Liang was born on June 4, 1991, in New York City and grew up in Flushing, Queens, with a brother and a pet Chihuahua. She briefly studied architecture at the Rhode Island School of Design before transferring to Parsons School of Design to study fashion design. Her father founded a restaurant in Manhattan Chinatown called Congee Village in 1996, when Liang was six. She frequently spent time at the restaurant after school. Her family restaurant and Chinatown in general serve as major design inspirations for her brand.

Liang met Dorian Booth, an architect, in 2016. They married in 2023. Liang has a son, Rainier, who has modeled for the brand's collections.

== History ==
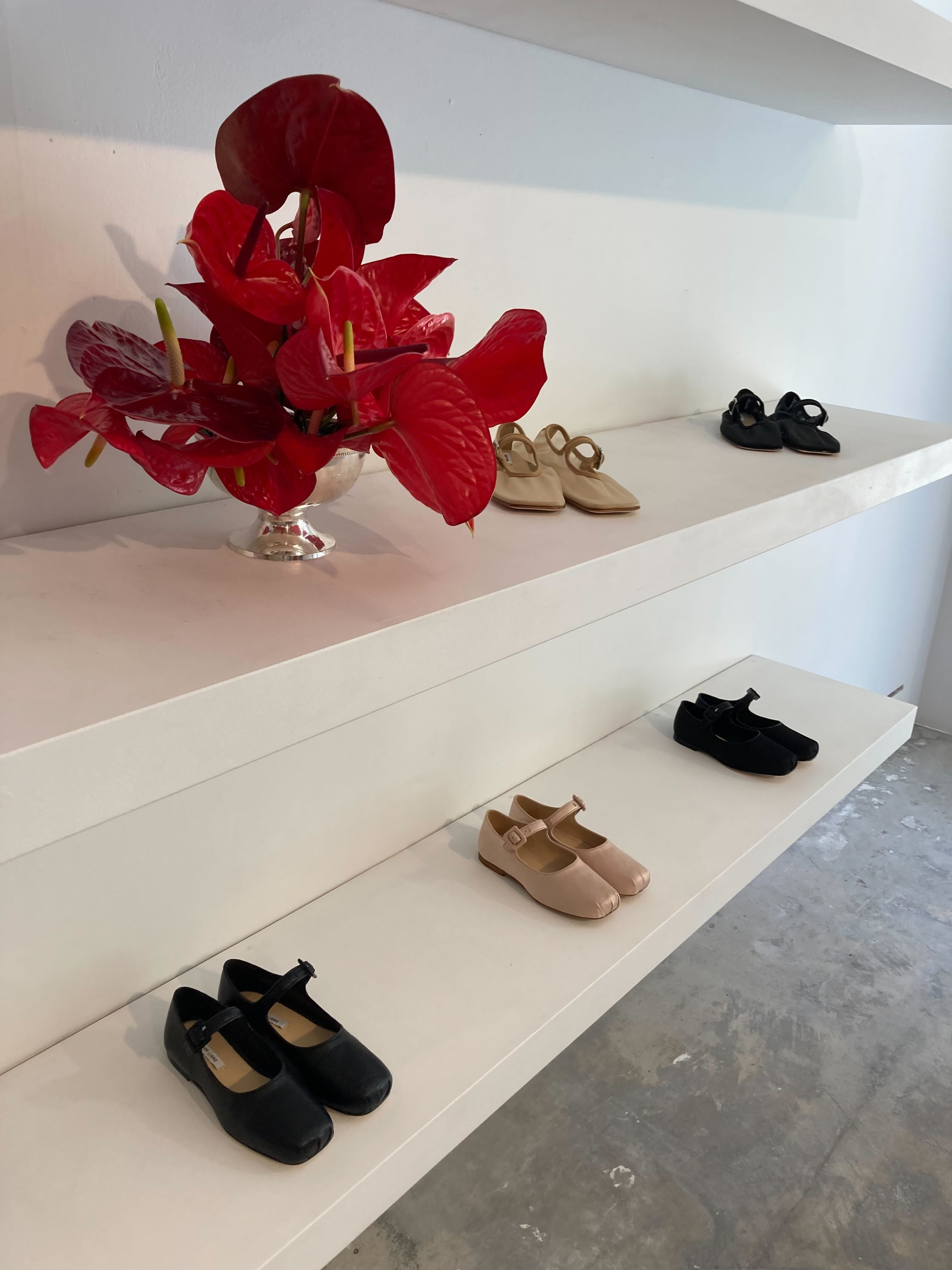
A display of shoes at the Sandy Liang flagship store in New York City, 2023

Liang launched her fashion label, Sandy Liang, in 2014, after graduating from Parsons. She was inspired by the style of grandmothers in Chinatown, and engaged her grandmother to model a collection of oversized coats. The brand's first collection was released in fall/winter 2014. In spring/summer 2015, the brand held a runway show at Liang's family restaurant.

In 2018, Liang was featured in Forbes 30 Under 30 in the category of art and design. In 2019, the label released a line of multicolor leopard-print fleece jackets inspired by hand-me-downs of Liang's childhood. The New York Times described it as the "hottest jacket at New York Fashion Week". The success of the jacket led to the label's first fashion show in September 2019. In 2020, the brand opened a flagship retail store on the Lower East Side of Manhattan.

In 2022, Sandy Liang released its first footwear line, taking inspiration from the aesthetics of ballet to create a cross between a Mary Jane and a pointe shoe. The release was highly successful, even taking pre-orders for restocks. In spring 2023, the brand released a version of the shoe in mesh, and their first bridal collection in the same year.

Sandy Liang's style has been associated with 2020s design trends like gorpcore, balletcore, and coquette, and compared with designers such as Simone Rocha and Miu Miu; Harper's Bazaar compared the brand's cult following to that of the streetwear brand Supreme. Its collections often feature ribbon-bow motifs, which was noted as a trend in both fashion and interior design in the spring and summer of 2023. Several of the brand's collections are inspired by different elements of founder Liang's girlhood such as Hello Kitty and hand-me-down clothing. In an interview, Liang cited the work of Sofia Coppola as a major influence, particularly the film Marie Antoinette.

Sandy Liang collaborated with Warby Parker in 2019, Away and Target in 2021, and Vans in 2020 and 2022. In 2023, the brand collaborated with Salomon to create a line of sneakers. In 2023, Sandy Liang collaborated with the dog clothing brand Little Beast on a line of fleeces and knitted sweaters for dogs. The brand also created its first line of homeware that year, including a doormat and a carpet runner as well as a variety of underwear and loungewear.
