= That Girl (trend) =

Wellness-related Internet trend

The "That Girl" aesthetic is an online subculture and fashion marketed as catering to people who seek a holistic emphasis on wellness. It is most often targeted at women, although not exclusively.

== History ==
"That Girl" began as a viral trend on TikTok by a user sharing their objectives for the new year: eating more fruit and vegetables, and reading more books. In the spring of 2021, the term gained popularity and spread from TikTok to YouTube, Instagram, and Pinterest through various formats including short form videos, extended vlogs, and curated Pinterest boards. By 2022, videos on TikTok with the hashtag #ThatGirl had over 2 billion views.

In a 2024, Kaeli McEwen, a TikTok influencer known for contributing to the "Clean Girl" aesthetic, gave an interview for Gotham magazine. In it she states that when she began on TikTok the clean girl aesthetic was referred to as "That Girl", and that is still is. She further states "the trend of "That Girl" or "Clean Girl" is always there. "I think it will always be there. It just maybe has different names at some points, but it all revolves around the same aesthetic." In a 2024 Her Campus article, Lachlan Larsen writes "Some still refer to the clean aesthetic as a 'that girl' aesthetic but 'that girl' aesthetic branched into 'vanilla girl aesthetic', 'baddie aesthetic', the 'night luxe aesthetic', etc."

In a 2024 article in Elle on the "clean or 'that' girl", Sakshi Rawte writes "It's no secret that this was the most-followed trend last year with over a billion views on social media", before calling for a "whoever-you-want-to-be-girl" who doesn't follow trends.

== Criticism ==
"In general, anything that establishes an unattainable ideal does more harm than good. It doesn't matter if it's filters and lighting on Insta or lifestyle trends on TikTok." -Pamela Rutledge, director of the media psychology research center at Fielding Graduate University.

The trend has been criticised as being highly unrealistic for the average individual. Many of the individuals marketing the trend are young, often white women attending post-secondary education. These influencers do not take into consideration those who have added responsibilities, such as parenthood, nor those who do not have the option of having a consistent work schedule thus making it harder for some to apply a routine and follow it consistently. For this reason, the trend potentially caters to a privileged audience.

Psychotherapist Hannah Tishman states that doing many of the routines associated with That Girl "is actually very beneficial—but doing these things every single day with no break is a recipe for imbalance. As humans, we need rest, recovery, and to allow ourselves to have days off."

== See also ==
- VSCO girl
- TikTok food trends
