= Ballet and fashion =

Throughout its history, the costume of ballet has influenced and been influenced by fashion. Ballet-specific clothing used in productions and during practice, such as ballet flats, ballerina skirts, legwarmers, and leotards have been elements of fashion trends. Ballet costume itself has adapted aesthetically over the years, incorporating contemporary fashion trends while also updating fabrics and materials to allow for greater freedom of movement for the dancers. The classic ballerina costume with a tutu and pointe shoes debuted in the 1830s. Ballet costume is marked by the innovation in lightweight materials such as tulle, chiffon, and organza.

In the early 20th century, productions by the Russian ballet company Ballets Russes had a large influence on fashion design in Paris. Designers incorporated ballet-inspired themes in their creations. Designers that have been influenced by ballet include Christian Dior, Elsa Schiaparelli, Paul Poiret, Coco Chanel, Jacques Fath, Jeanne Lanvin, Madeleine Vionnet, Molly Goddard, and Simone Rocha.

== History ==
=== 17th and 18th centuries ===
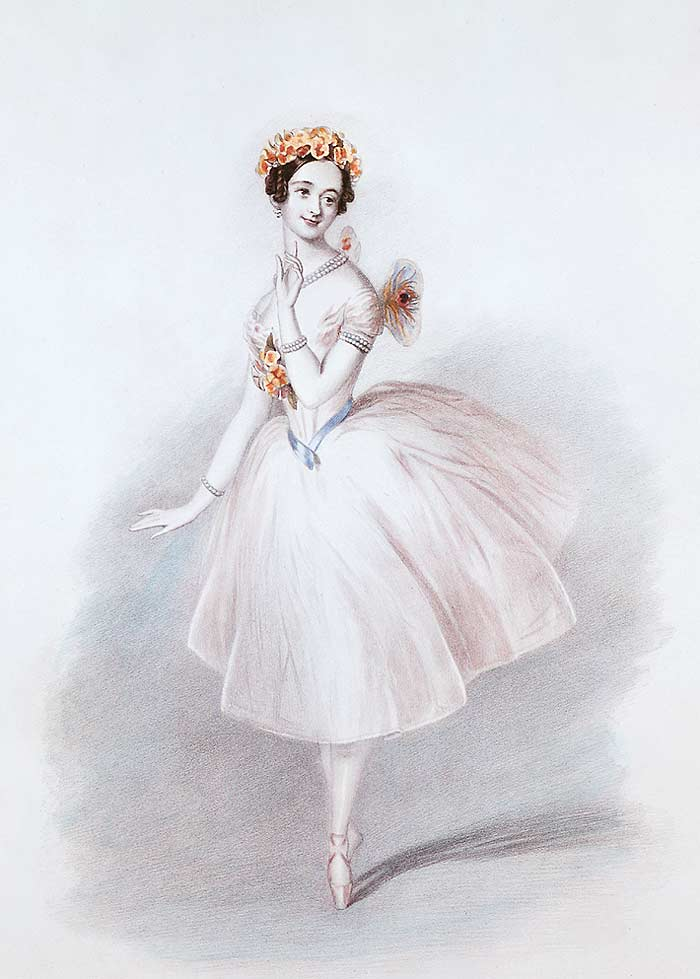
Marie Taglioni dancing the title role in La Sylphide, 1832

Ballet costume originated in the 17th-century royal courts of Italy and France, including that of Louis XIV. Early costume designs in ballet productions were based on court dress, though more extravagant. All of the performers in early ballets were men, with boys performing the female roles en travesti. In the 18th century, as ballet became professionalized and moved from the courts to the theaters, women joined the ranks of ballet dancers. Traditionally, dancers wore heeled shoes, until the 1730s, when Paris Opera Ballet dancer Marie Camargo was one of the first to wear ballet slippers instead. She also wore midcalf-length skirts and close-fitting drawers.

Another influential ballet performer and choreographer of the 18th century, Marie Sallé, also challenged conventional theatrical costume. In her production of Pygmalion (1734), which she choreographed and performed in London, Sallé appeared in a simple muslin robe, opposing the conventional use of elaborate garments, such as skirts and corsets. This costume clearly illustrated the relationship between performance and costume, highlighting the development of expression within ballet.

Until the late 18th century, lead dancers in a ballet company often wore masks. The practice was abandoned after balletmaster Jean-Georges Noverre and choreographer Maximilien Gardel dispensed with them, seeing how they impeded the dancers' movements and the ability to see their facial expressions. Similarly, cumbersome hairstyles and wigs that were not conducive to ballet movements were largely excluded from the stage.

=== 19th century ===
Ballet costume has an essential role in facilitating the movements of dancers while "maintaining the integrity of the line of the body". Technical and visual problems with ballet costume are avoided through the creation of well-designed and proportioned clothing. Ballet costume has evolved alongside choreography to allow for the display of musculature.

In the late 18th and early 19th centuries, the industrialisation of cotton manufacturing led to the widespread availability of cheap cotton fabrics such as tulle, muslin, tarlatan, and gauze. Ballet companies were able to produce new costumes for each production.

Ballet costume during the early 19th century mirrored the women's fashions of the era. Ballet appropriated high fashion elements, including full sleeves, revealing decolletage, fitted waist, bell-shaped skirts, and more diaphanous fabrics. Adaptations such as lighter fabrics and raised hemlines allowed dancers greater freedom of movement and the audience to appreciate the dancer's footwork. As clothing became less restricted, the natural silhouette was emphasized.

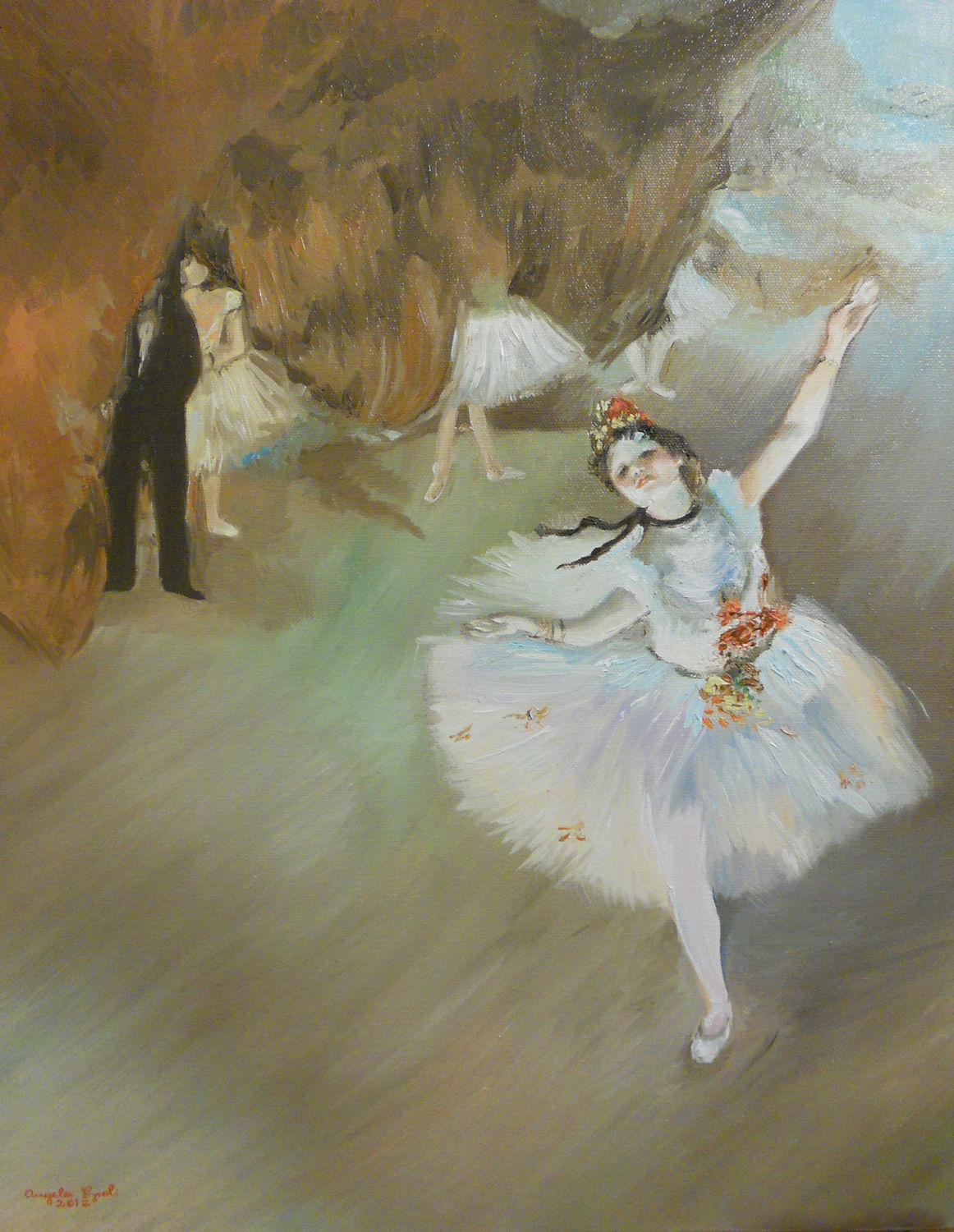
L'Étoile by Edgar Degas, c. 1878

Pointe shoes were invented around 1820 and the archetypal look of the romantic ballerina was provided by Maria Taglioni in the 1832 ballet La Sylphide. Her fitted décolleté bodice, diaphanous calf-length tulle skirt, and satin pointe shoes laced around the calf provided the template for the ballerina costume. Her ballerina skirt was a shortened version of the 1830s fashion gown. She was the first ballerina to dance a full-length ballet en pointe, and became very popular with images of her widely published. Following her fame, luxury fabrics and corsets were produced bearing the names Taglioni or La Sylphide.

As ballet emerged as entertainment for aristocrats, the ballet dancer became principally a woman's profession and the reputation of ballerinas declined in the later 19th century. The feminization of ballet was due in part to a larger male audience. Ballerinas were frequently poor, marginalized members of society, regarded more as workers than artists. They were often subject to the attention of lascivious men, sexually commodified, and sometimes forced into prostitution.

Styles of ballet costume were influenced by the popularity of romantic narratives of regional and supernatural folklore, such as the sylph motif. Towards the end of the 19th century, the classical tutu was codified in St. Petersburg during the era of ballet master Marius Petipa. During this time, the tutu was shortened and the boxes of pointe shoes were reinforced.

=== 20th century ===
==== Ballets Russes ====
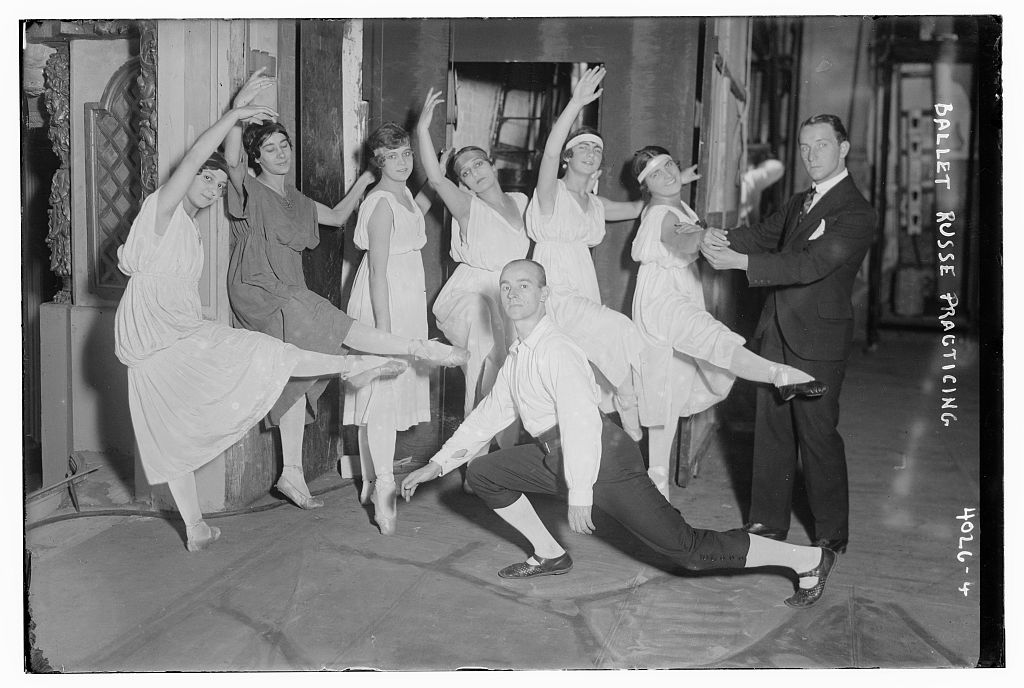
Performers from the Ballets Russes, c. late 1910s

Beginning in 1909, the Russian ballet company Ballets Russes brought high classical ballet to the West, principally in Paris. Fashion designers and haute couture were inspired by the influential ballet company. Léon Bakst was the troupe's principal costume designer in the early 1900s. His designs inspired Paul Poiret, who also designed for the company. Trends in Parisian fashion were adapted into ballet costume by Ballets Russes. The dress from Stravinsky's 1910 ballet The Firebird was influential in fashion design. The Orientalist aesthetic of Ballets Russes influenced the boldly colored trousers and harem skirts and trousers of fashion designer Paul Poiret. Coco Chanel designed costumes for the 1924 ballet Le Train Bleu and went on to create ballet-inspired fashions.

==== 1920s ====
Ballets Russes continued to have an influence on fashion into the 1920s. A turning point in the relationship between ballet and fashion was Sergei Diaghilev's 1921 production of The Sleeping Beauty. The ballet's use of light pastels such as lilac influenced color trends in fashion. The production's bluebird blue costumes inspired Elsa Schiaparelli to create her signature color "sleeping blue". French fashion designer Jeanne Lanvin's full-skirted robe de style dresses of the mid-1920s and Madeleine Vionnet's Ballerina dress both had inspiration in the ballerina costume. According to ballet historian Ilyana Karthas, during the 1920s images of femininity were promoted in the context of athleticism, exercise, and the physical body.

Italian fashion designer Elsa Schiaparelli also collaborated with the Ballets Russes, inspired by the surrealistic costuming of Giorgio de Chirico in Diaghilev's 1929 production of Le Bal.

==== 1930s and balletomania ====
The 1932 ballet Cotillon was choreographed by George Balanchine and starred Tamara Toumanova, one of the first Baby Ballerinas. Costumes from the production were designed by Christian Bérard and made by Barbara Karinska, who innovated the layering of differently colored tulle. Bérard's designs inspired the glittering tulle gowns that Coco Chanel designed in the 1930s.

Since the 1930s, ballet costume has inspired the fashion trends of fitted bodices and bell-shaped silhouettes. Materials used for tutus, such as chiffon, silk tulle, and organza were later incorporated into fashion collections. The romantic-era tutu style also had an influence on the design of gowns. In the 1930s, longer dresses with tulle skirts became fashionable, as exemplified by Coco Chanel's 1937 "Etoiles" dress, which drew inspiration from Balanchine's 1932 ballet Cotillon.

The balletomania trend of the 1930s and 1940s had a marked influence on fashion. In the early 1930s, ballet fashion was frequently featured in magazines. Ballerinas were also employed as models from the 1930s onward.

==== 1940s and 1950s ====
With the advent of synthetic materials, ballet practice clothing such as leotards and tights became popular as fashion pieces from the 1940s on.

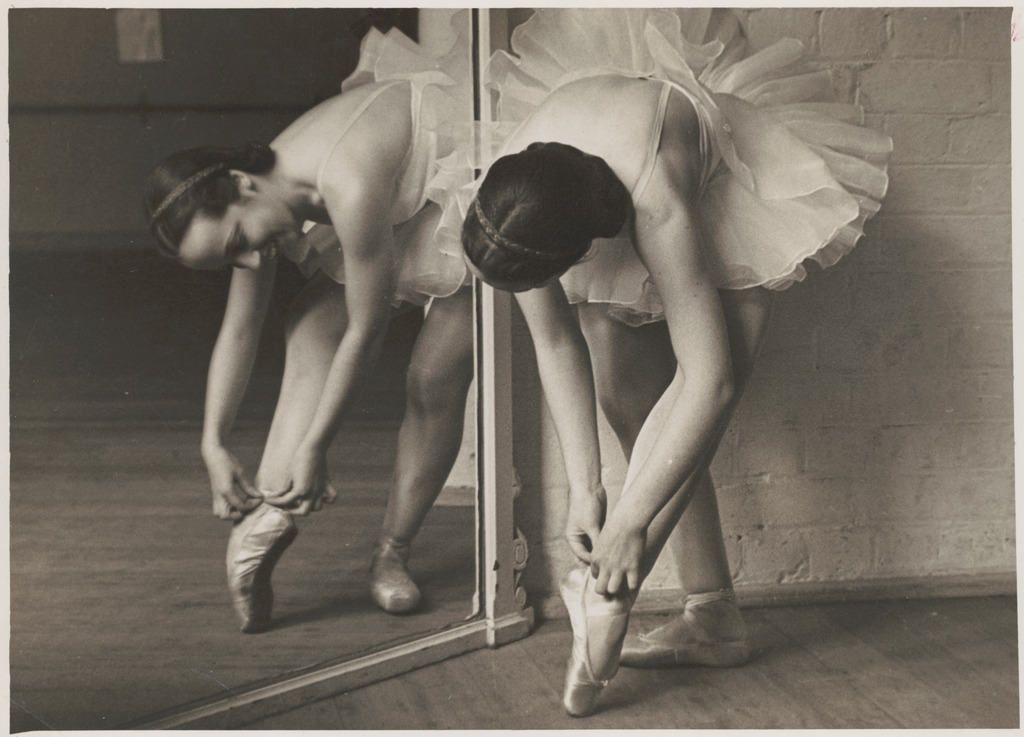
Pointe shoes, designed in the early 19th century, would later be absorbed into fashion in the form of ballet flats and ballet boots.

In 1941, former ballet student and fashion editor Diana Vreeland innovated the use of pointe shoes as everyday wear, in part because wartime restrictions did not apply to them. Due to a shortage of leather, fashion designer Claire McCardell commissioned the dance house Capezio to produce a range of ballet flats to match her designs. The ballet flat went on to become everyday footwear.

Designers of high fashion and haute couture collaborated frequently with star ballerinas such as Margot Fonteyn in the 1940s. Couturiers such as Pierre Balmain designed costume for ballet as well as high fashion. Designers Christian Dior and Jacques Fath were both influenced by ballet costume. Costumes designed by Fath for the 1948 film The Red Shoes featuring the ballerina Moira Shearer were also influential in creating a demand for ballet-inspired fashion.

The fashion house Balmain, founded by Pierre Balmain, and the designer Cristóbal Balenciaga drew inspiration from the aesthetics of ballet costume. The use of feathers in the ballet costumes of ballerina-bird characters in productions of The Firebird, The Dying Swan, and Swan Lake was also mimicked in fashion.

==== 1960s and 1970s ====
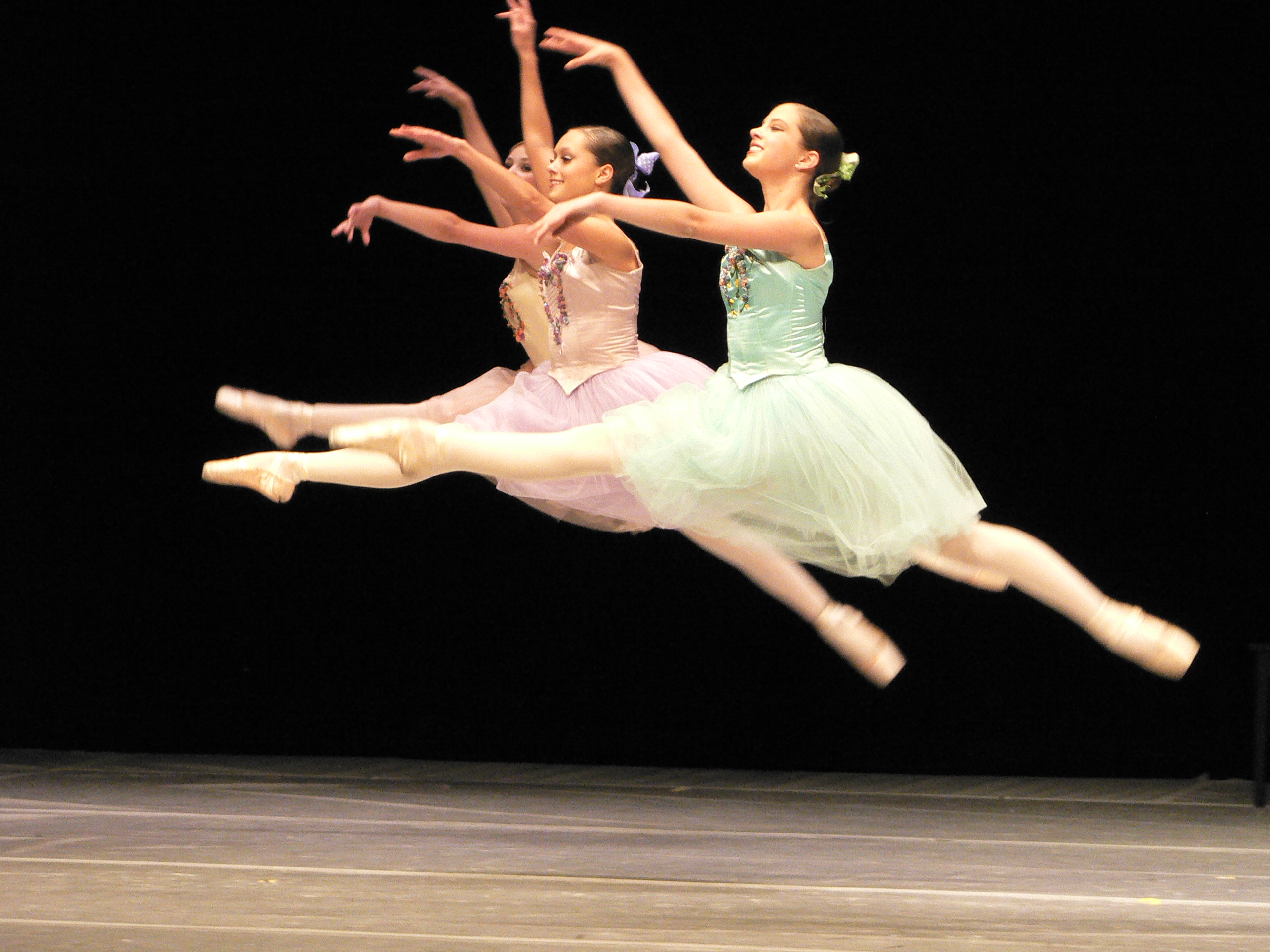
The tulle fabric of tutus, pointe shoes, and soft pastel color palettes have all influenced fashion trends.

During the late 1960s and 1970s, the clothing brand Danskin produced leotards that could be worn for dance as well as streetwear. Fashion designer Bonnie August popularized the look of unitards worn under wrap skirts in the mid-1970s. Ballet-inspired fashion designs experienced a revival in the 1970s during the disco era while athleisure incorporated mainstays of ballet rehearsal clothing such as leotards.

In the 1970s, Dance Theatre of Harlem founder Arthur Mitchell decided that dancers' tights and shoes should match their skin tone. The dance apparel company Capezio produced brown pointe shoes for the company.

A 1976 collection from Yves Saint Laurent paid homage to the Ballets Russes and Serge Diaghilev.

=== 21st century ===
During the early 2000s, a ballet-inspired fashion trend drawing heavily on warm-up clothing was called "dancer off-duty". In the 2000s, ballet fashion was popularized on film and television through the film Black Swan and Carrie Bradshaw's iconic tulle skirt from Sex and The City. The 2000s saw the lines of companies that produce pointe shoes broaden to include skin tones of people of color, including Black women in ballet.

A 2020 exhibition Ballerina: Fashion's Modern Muse was held at The Museum at FIT.

==== Balletcore ====
A resurgence in interest in ballerina-inspired fashion in the mid-2020s came to be known as balletcore. The fashion trend drew inspiration from the graceful and elegant aesthetic of ballet dancers, which has been called "hyper-feminine" and embraces both comfort and body movement in a context that explores femininity. The popularity of the trend has been attributed to Gen Z's obsession with nostalgia. Balletcore has also seen notable popularity in Japan.

Balletcore continued fashion's use of traditional ballet costumes such as ballet flats, pointe shoes, ballerina skirts, leotards, and tights. Athleisure fashions incorporate dancewear elements such as legwarmers, which are often layered or combined with tie skirts and wrap tops, as well as delicate accessories like ribbon chokers and ballet slipper-inspired shoes. Balletcore continued to rely on lightweight materials such as tulle and satin, organza, sheer fabrics, mesh, and spandex. Ballet-inspired fashion continues to emphasize soft pastel hues such as pink, peach, baby blue, lilac, and light neutral colors.

In the 2020s, ballet-inspired elements have increased the popularity as a part of the collections of Rodarte and Miu Miu, as well as those of fashion designers Molly Goddard and Simone Rocha. While principally a phenomenon in women's clothing, ballet has also influenced designs in men's wear and workout wear, with brands creating collections that combined functionality with a balletic aesthetic.

== See also ==
- History of ballet
- History of fashion design
- Music and fashion
